= Timeline of Sydney Harbour ferries =

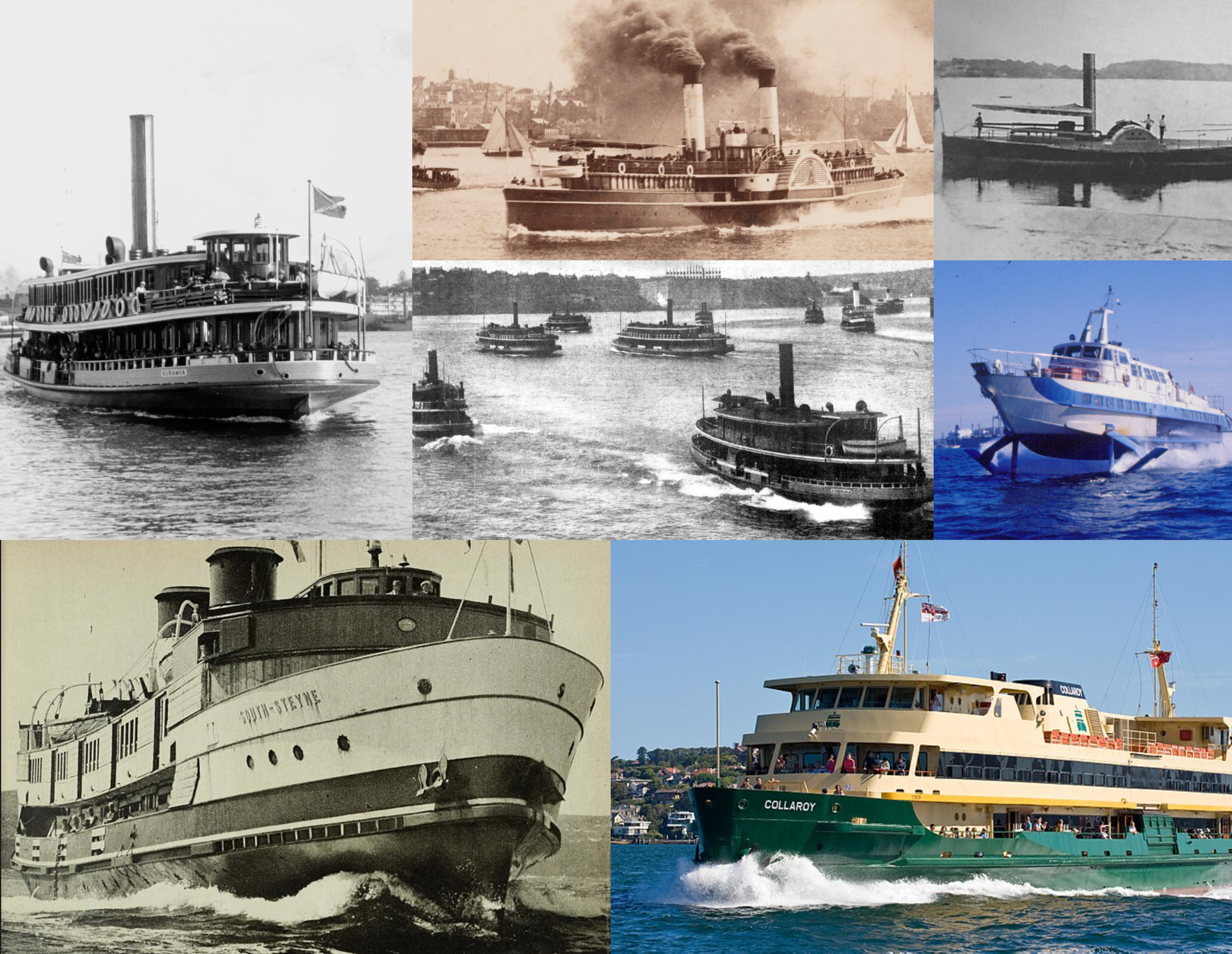
Top to bottom and left to right, Kuramia (1914–1934), PS Brighton (1883–1916), Herald (1855–1884), K-class ferries in Sydney Cove, hydrofoil Curl Curl (1973–1992), South Steyne (1938–1974), Collaroy (1988–)

Sydney Harbour ferry services date back to the first years of Sydney's European settlement. Slow and sporadic boats ran along the Parramatta River from Sydney to Parramatta and served the agricultural settlements in between. By the mid-1830s, speculative ventures established regular services. From the late-nineteenth century the North Shore developed rapidly. A rail connection to Milsons Point took alighting ferry passengers up the North Shore line to Hornsby, New South Wales via North Sydney. Without a bridge connection, increasingly large fleets of steamers serviced the cross harbour routes and in the early twentieth century, Sydney Ferries Limited was the largest ferry operator in the world.

However, arguably the most well-known is the Manly ferry service, and its large ship-like ferries that negotiate the beam swells of the Sydney Heads. From the mid-nineteenth century, the Port Jackson and Manly Steamship Company and its forerunners ran commuter and weekend excursion services to the beach-side suburb.

The 1932 opening of the Sydney Harbour Bridge dramatically and permanently changed Sydney Harbour. Sydney Ferries Limited annual patronage fell from 40 million to 15 million almost immediately. The hardships of the Great Depression and Second World War slowed the ferries' decline, but by 1951 the NSW State Government was forced to take over the ailing Sydney Ferries Limited. The Manly service fared better, and the Port Jackson company's peak year was 1946, after which a slow decline saw it too taken over by the NSW State Government in the 1970s. Ferry operations were privatised in 2015 with vessels and facilities remaining in public ownership.

Sydney's first ferries were sail and/or oar powered and by the mid-19th century, paddle steamers were well established. Double-ended ferries became common as they did not require turning at terminating wharves in Sydney's busy but narrow bays, including the main hub at Circular Quay. Double-ender ferries, however, provided technological challenges for screw (propeller) propulsion and Sydney's shift from paddle steamers to screw ferries in the closing years of the nineteenth century was relatively late. Diesel power first came to Sydney Harbour ferries mainly through the conversion of existing steam ferries to diesel in the 1930s and the 1950s, as ferry companies could generally not afford new ferries in the slow post-Bridge decades. Hydrofoils were introduced to the Manly run in the 1960s and 1970s halving travel times for those willing to pay a premium fare. Government investment in new vessels during the 1970s and 1980s saw the replacement of the surviving early twentieth century vessels. New vessels included modern Lady-class ferries, four large Manly ferries, and nine First-Fleet ferries. The most recent decades have seen the introduction of the RiverCats, JetCats, SuperCats and in 2017, the Emerald-class ferries. Apart from the four Manly "Freshwater-class" ferries, the current Sydney Ferries fleet comprises all catamarans.

== Early days ==
- October 1789 - The Rose Hill Packet is launched and provides a link between Sydney Cove and the farming settlement of Parramatta. The hoy is crafted by convicts and is powered by sails and oars. Return trips between Sydney Cove to Parramatta could take a week to complete.
- 1793 - The first regular Parramatta River ferry service begins.
- circa 1800 - A number of small passage boats manned by a single oarsman provide services. The Rose Hill Packet is thought to have been discarded.

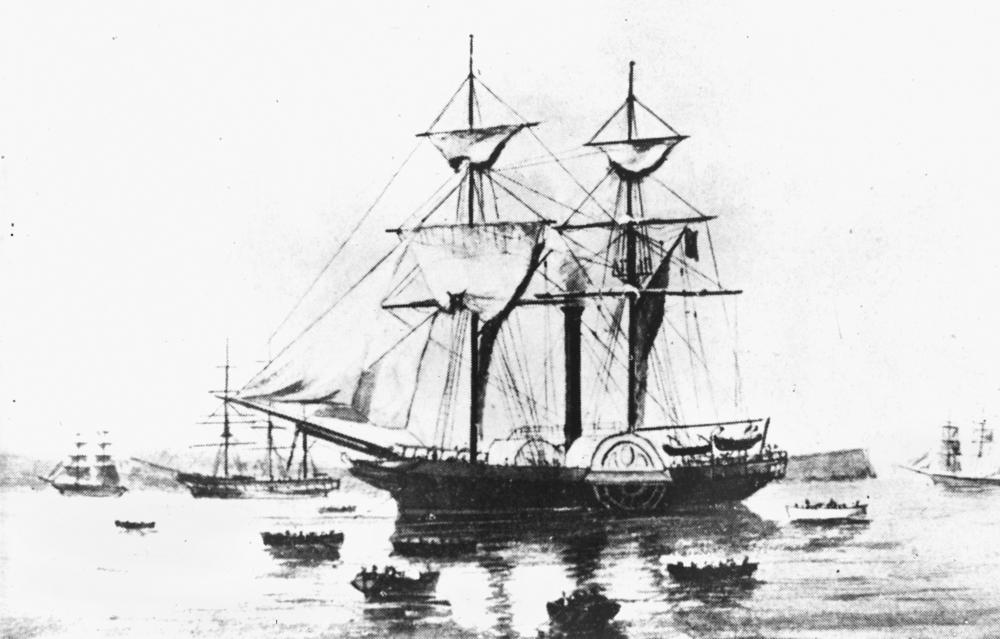
Ocean-going steamer, Sophia Jane, was used sporadically on the Parramatta River.

- circa 1830 - Ex-convict, Billy Blue, provides Sydney's first regular cross-harbour rowboat from Dawes Point to Blues Point.
- 1830s - A sporadic ferry service is set up between Balmoral Beach and Balgowlah that shortens the long bush journey between Sydney and Manly and Northern Beaches. It is provided by a small sailing ketch operated by Barney Kearns. From Balmoral, passengers have to travel overland to Milson's Point where they are rowed across the harbour by a waterman. The service does not last long requiring a longer and difficult overland trip.
- 1831 - The ocean-going steamer Sophia Jane arrives in Sydney and used sporadically on the Parramatta River in between towing and coastal trade to Newcastle.
- 1 June 1831 - The first Australian-built paddle steamer, Surprise, starts regular service to Parramatta. She has limited financial success and is sold to Hobart in 1832.
- 5 October 1832 - Experiment, a paddle-steamer powered by horses on a treadmill, makes her first run to Parramatta. She immediately lost money and was sold.
- c1832 - The Bedlam Point manually operated punt (Abbotsford - Gladesville) becomes the first ferry crossing.
- 1833 - the Australian Conveyance Company is formed and launches a new ferry, Australia on the Parramatta service. With limited competition, the service is a success with a dividend paid in 1836 of 38 per cent.
- 9 April 1835 - Experiment is put back into service having been fitted with 12 hp steam engine. Under the new ownership of shipping entrepreneur, John Edye Manning, she carries passengers and cargo, as well as towing work for the next five years. Australia and Experiment thus provide the first regular ferry service in Sydney.
- 1837 - Following the success of Australia, the Australian Conveyance Company commissions a new steamer Rapid which promised a ninety-minute trip

== 1840s and 1850s ==
- circa 1841 - A cross harbour service run by punt, Princess, runs in daylight hours between Dawes and Blues Points. The service fails after fifteen months.
- 1844 - The Waterman's Company introduces a service to Balmain with the paddle steamer Waterman, however, her reliability is poor.
- 1845 - Brothers Thomas and James Gerrard, use the small steamer, Fairy Queen, between Windmill Street and Blues Point, forming the first reliable cross-harbour service.
- 1847 - Henry Perdriau & Partners take over the Waterman and expand the service over the next three decades.
- 9 October 1847 - A small timber paddle steamer, Brothers, begins a run from Windmill Street in The Rocks to Blues Point.
- 1848 - John and Joseph Gerrard shift Brothers to a sporadic Manly service, and she becomes accepted as the first Manly ferry.
- 1853 - Henry Gilbert Smith charters Brothers for the first scheduled service between Sydney and Manly as the tourist trade grows.
- 1854 - Paddle steamer Victoria begins excursion trips to Watsons Bay.
- 1855 - Iron paddle steamer, Herald, is imported from England in sections and assembled in Sydney for the newly formed North Shore Steam Company. She is used on a fledgling North Shore route between Dawes Point and Blues Point and also as a tug to make her financially viable.
- 1855 - The Sydney-Parramatta railway opens, however, due to its alignment considerably south of the harbour, ferry services are still important for services along the Parramatta River.
- 1856 - Paddle steamer, Victoria, begins daily services to Manly. Running until 1860, she is the first regular Manly ferry.
- 1859 - Phantom, the first large double-ended ferry on the Manly run, is put into service by a new business partnership between Henry Gilbert Smith and SB Skinner established to operate the ferries.
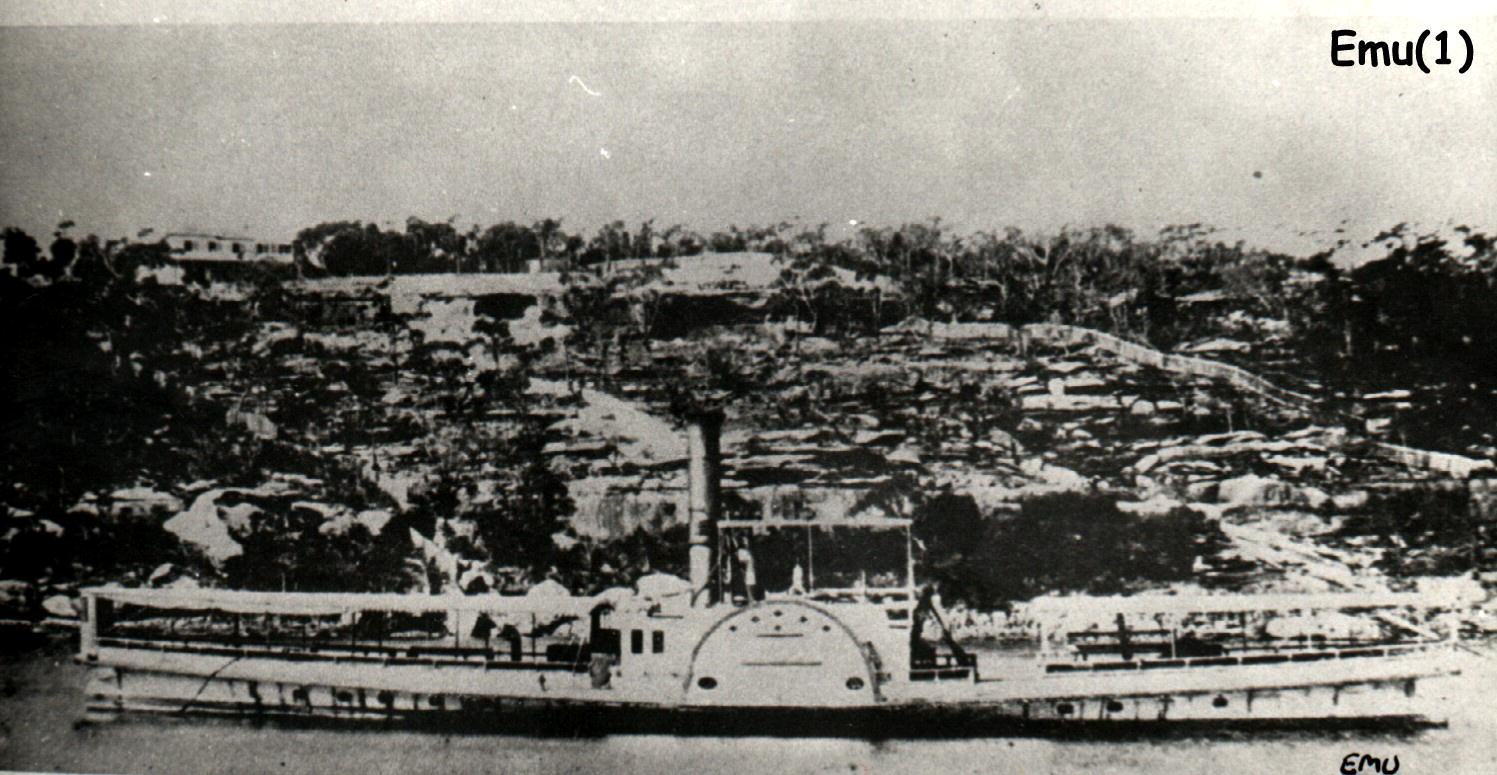
Paddle steamer, Emu

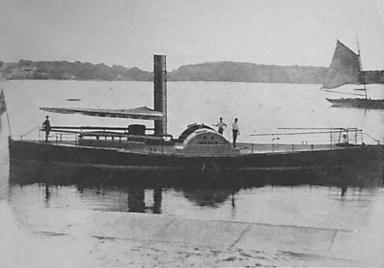
Herald was used on a fledgling service to the North Shore

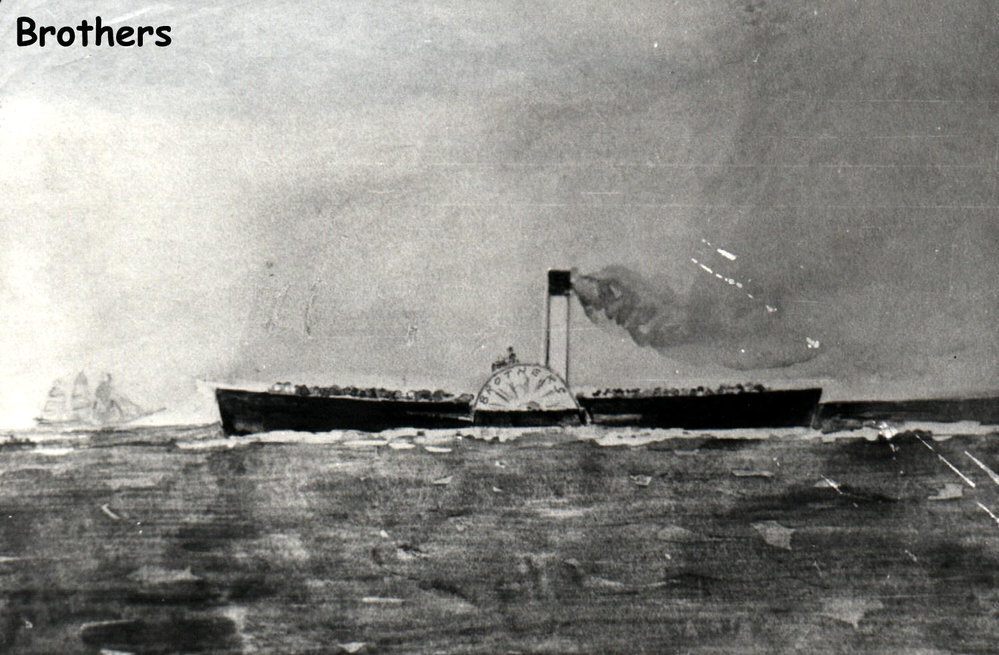
Painting of Brothers which provided the first scheduled Manly ferry service.

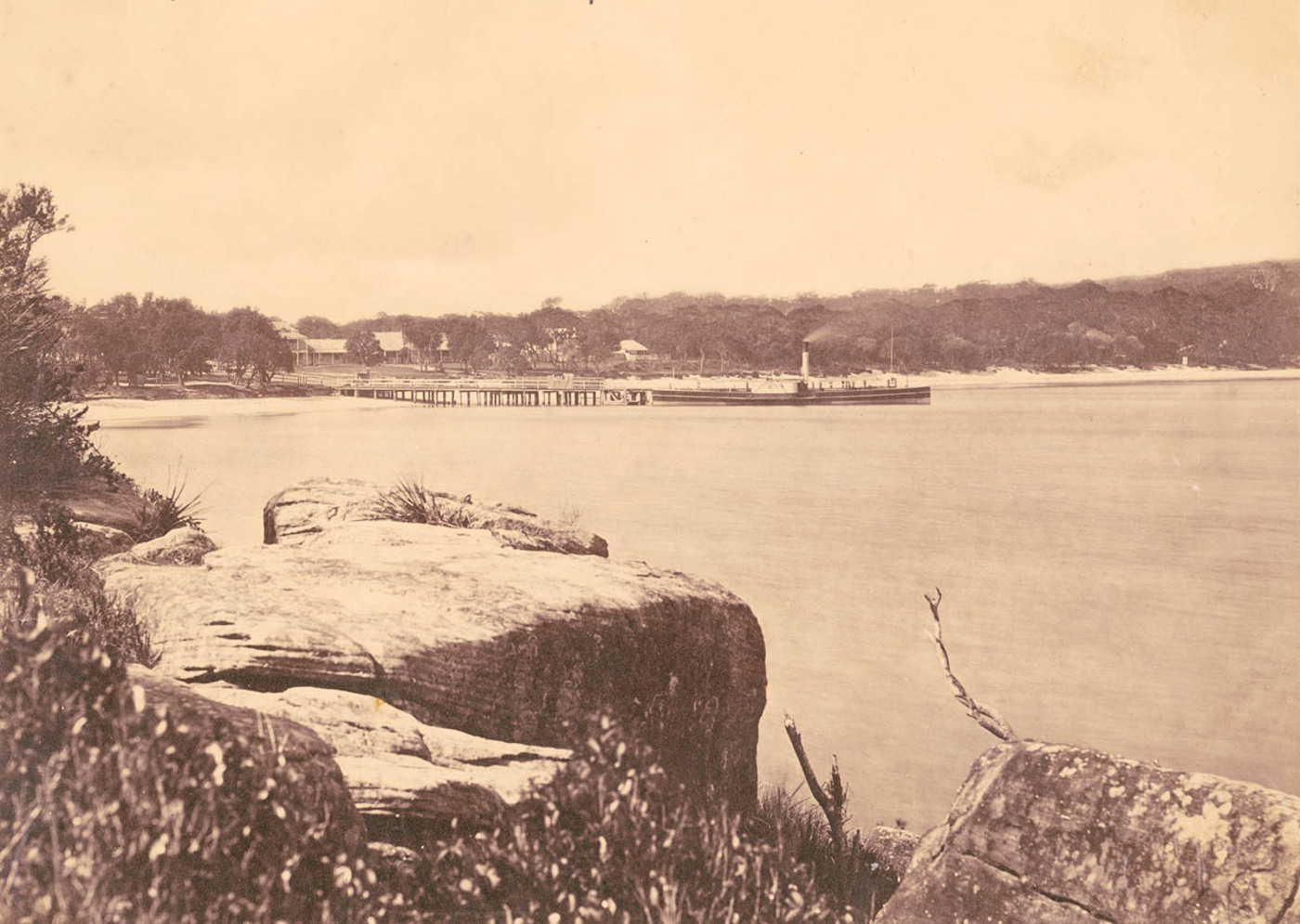
Manly Wharf, 1870s, with Phantom.

== 1860s and 1870s ==
- 1860s - The cross-harbour punt at Bedlam Point is joined by manually operated punts at Gladesville (Five Dock Point - Huntleys Point) and Iron Cove (Rozelle - Drummoyne).
- 1860 - Mosman landowner Richard Hayes Harnett commences excursion services to promote his land sales hiring steamers Black Swan, Perri, Brothers and Herald. The service is abandoned due to slow sales.
- 1861 - City to North Shore services have grown considerably and the North Shore Ferry Company is formed. The company's first ferry is Kirribilli (I). Alexander, Nell, Galatea and Coombra follow. The unincorporated company is the forerunner of what will become Sydney Ferries Limited in 1900. Its backers include James Milson and Francis Lord.
- 1864 - A regular ferry service is commenced to the Neutral Bay area, however, it is soon discontinued.
- 1865 - The Parramatta River Steam Company is formed by Charles Edward Jeanneret initially in partnership with Jules Joubert. It is incorporated the following year. Its first services are by Ysobel and its main vessel will be Adelaide (later renamed Swan).
- 1867/68 - Ownership of the Manly services passes to TJ Parker and later Thomas Hesleton who expanded both passenger and cargo services acquiring the first permanent saloon steamer, Royal Alfred, in 1873.
- 1870s - Land subdivision sees development east of Milsons Point in the Neutral Bay and Mosman areas. Mosman is originally an excursion area and residential development suffers until regular ferry services began in the 1870s.
- 1871 - Harnett recommences ferry services to Mosman using Herald.
- 1871 - The Joubert family commences ferry services to Hunters Hill and a service along the Lane Cove River to Figtree.
- 1873 (circa) - Herald is working to Mosman Bay and Neutral Bay in a somewhat irregular weekday timetable.
- 1873 - The North Shore Ferry Company is reformed as the North Shore Steam Ferry Company
- 1873 - Jeanneret establishes his own ferry operation which becomes the monopoly Parramatta River services by 1875.
- 1875 - Ownership of the Manly service passes to JR Carey who, with other partners the following year, injects new capital into the service.
- 1876 - William Harmer begins a ferry service to Watsons Bay.
- 1876 - Harnett buys back the Mosman estate and he successfully subdivides the land. He commences a more successful service for the new residents using Golden Rose, Zeus, Speedwell and Matilda. The service is taken over by Shipley, Chapman and Company in 1878 and by Charles Jeanneret in 1881.
- 1877 - The Port Jackson Steam Boat Company is incorporated and commences services to Manly from Circular Quay via Woolloomooloo.
- 1878 - The North Shore Steam Ferry Company becomes the limited liability North Shore Steam Ferry Company.
- 1878 - Fairlight, the first purpose-built Manly ferry, enters service for the Port Jackson Steam Boat Company. The first of five subsequent Manly ferries built in Scotland, the paddle-steamer is rated at 950 passengers and works on the harbour until 1914.
- 1879 - The North Shore Company introduces Sydney's first, and the world's second, double-ended screw ferry, Wallaby. This remains the basic design of all Sydney double-ended screw ferries, however, the company continues acquiring paddle steamers until 1885. Double-ended screw ferries become the norm for the fleet from 1891 with the introduction of Kangaroo.
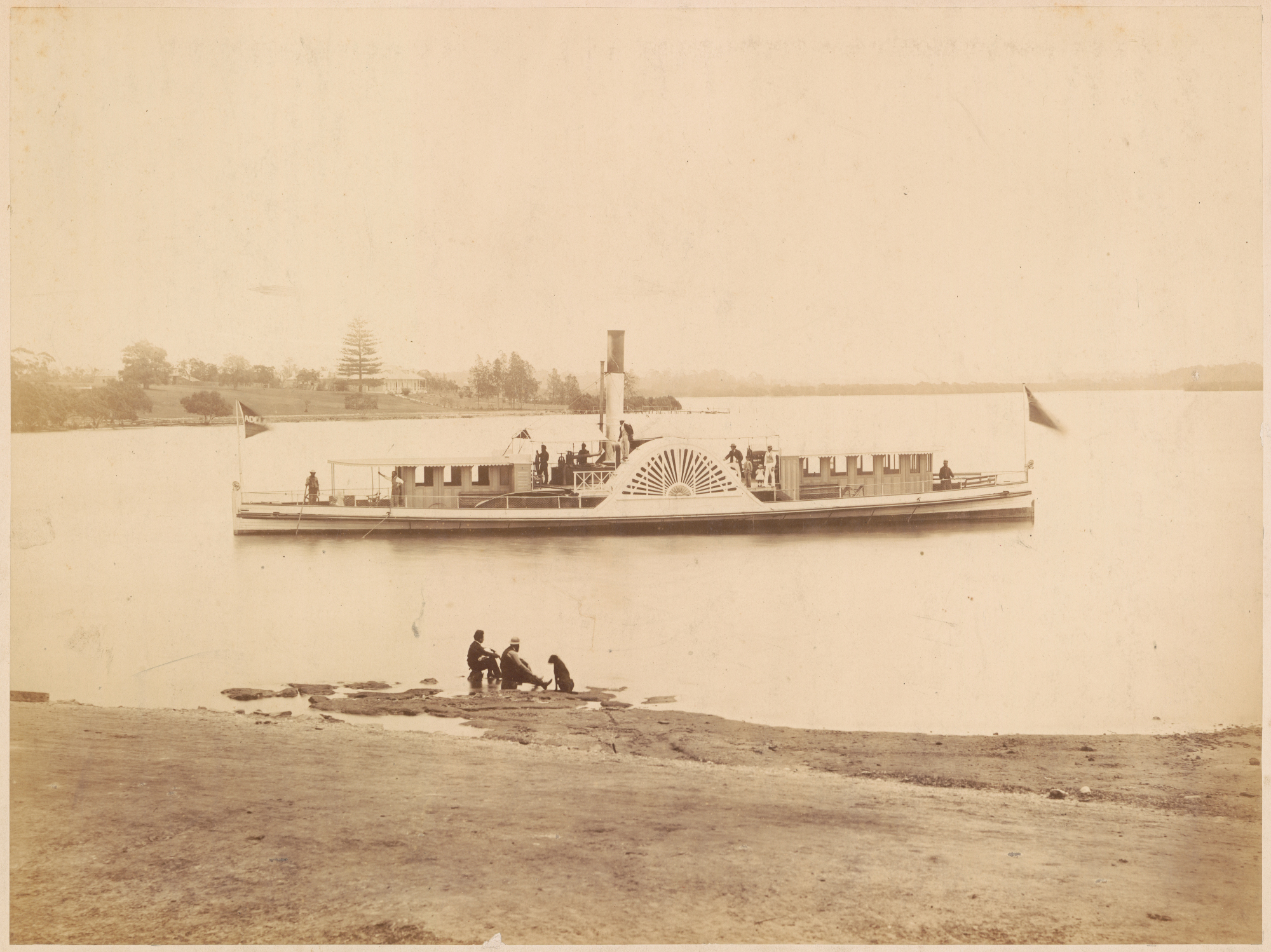
The 1865 paddle-steamer Adelaide (later Swan), the Parramatta River Steam Company's main ferry

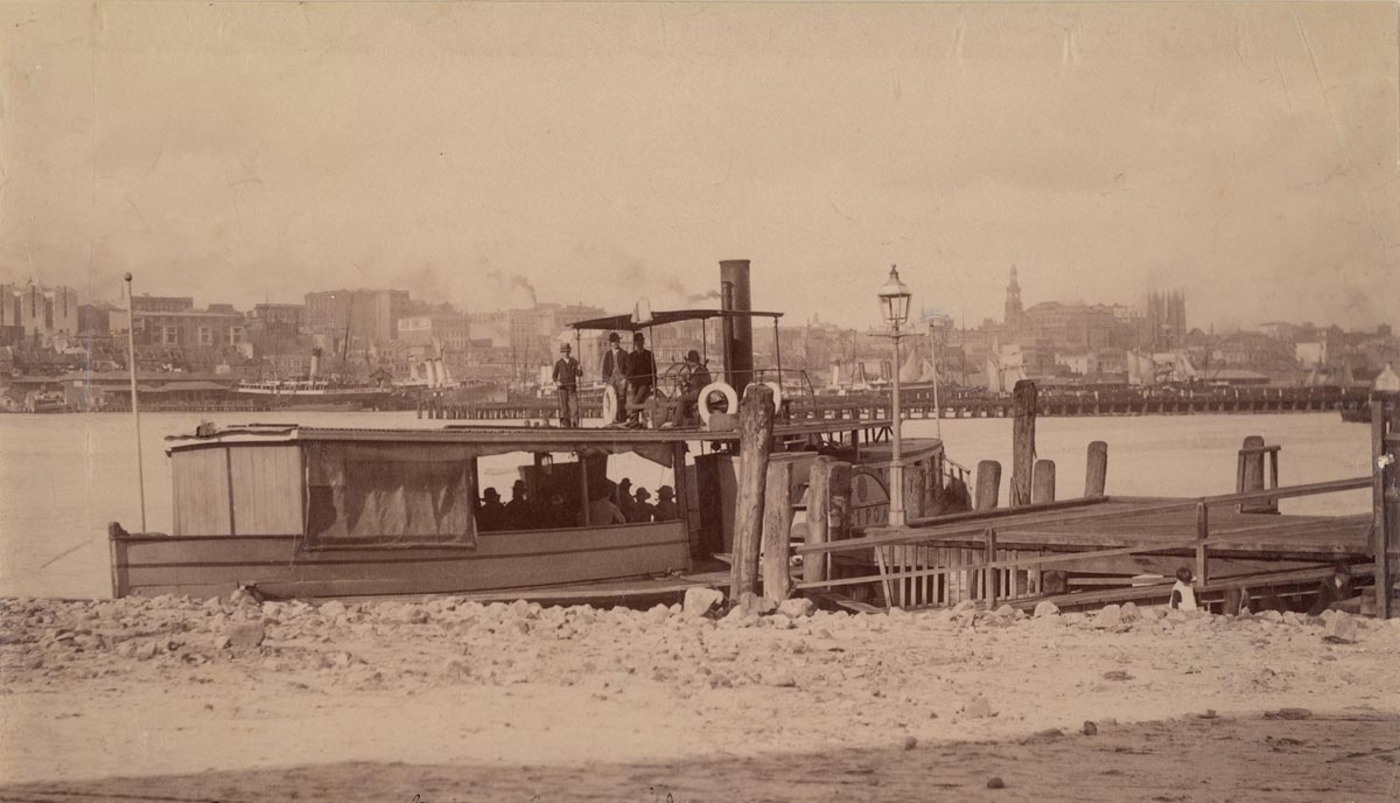
Leipoa (1872), wooden paddle steamer for H. Perdriau's Balmain Steam Ferry Co Ltd.

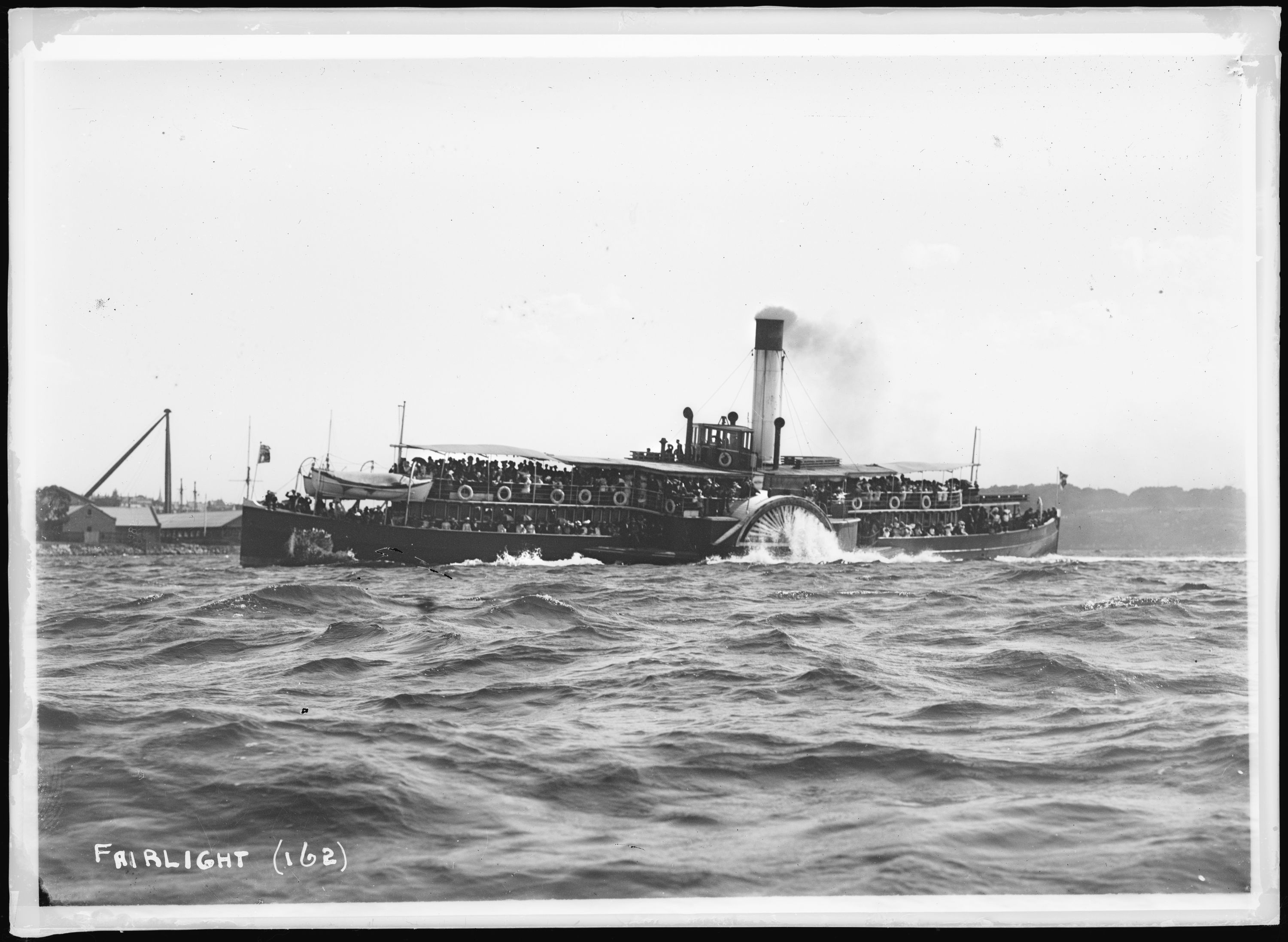
Fairlight (1878-1914), built in Scotland, was the first purpose-designed Manly ferry.

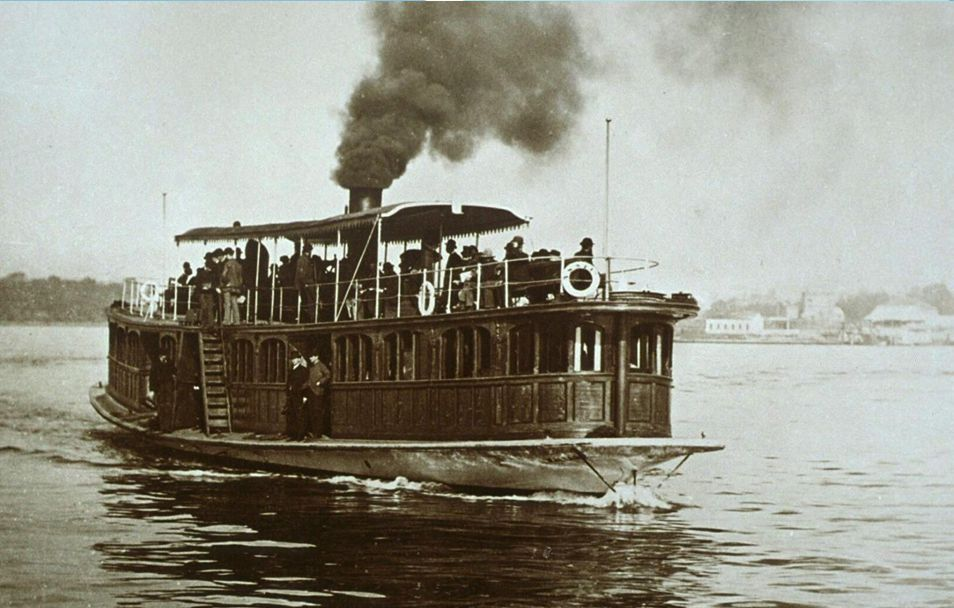
Wallaby, Sydney's first, and the world's second, double-ended screw ferry

== 1880s ==
- 1881 - G Shipley begins services to the North Shore with Katie and Pacific.
- 1881 - The Port Jackson Steams Boat Company is reincorporated as Port Jackson Steamship Co. Limited. New vessels are acquired.
- 1881 - Aleathea is introduced and is the second double-ended screw ferry and the first ferry on the harbour with electric lighting.
- 1881 - Sir John Robertson takes over and expands Watson Bay services. In 1887, the company is formed into a limited liability company, the Watsons Bay Steam and South Shore Steam Ferry Company. In comparison to other harbour areas, the service relies more heavily on tourist trade although there is considerable residential trade from the South Head peninsula. The service also derives much trade from the Garden Island Naval Dockyard which was a separated island until World War II.
- 1882 - Charles Jeanneret begins services to the North Shore.
- 1882 - The Perdriau family form the Balmain Steam Ferry Company Limited as a limited liability company. It faces competition from the J Watson and Partners which it buys out in 1887. The company, along with the North Shore Steam Ferry Company Limited, go on to refine the double-ended wooden ferry which will form the backbone of inner harbour ferry fleets for most of the twentieth century.
- 1883 - The Port Jackson Steamship Company commissions the double-ended paddle steamer, Brighton. At 67 metres (220 ft) in length, it is the largest ferry on Sydney Harbour at the time, and with a high level of appointment, it is a passenger favourite.
- 1883 - Charles Jeanneret provides a tramway from the second Parramatta Wharf (Redbank Wharf, near Duck River) located further downstream allowing deeper draft screw steamers to berth.
- 1884 - The first all-night service from Circular Quay to Lavender Bay via McMahons Point and Milsons Point begins.
- 1885 - The limited liability Neutral Bay Steam Ferry Company Limited is formed running services to Mosman, Cremorne, and Neutral Bay.
- 1886 - A cable tram service from Ridge Street in North Sydney to Milsons Point commences and the main ferry wharf is moved there and it becomes the harbour's busiest. Prior to this, most North Shore passenger traffic had been via the Lavender Bay ferry wharf.
- 1886 - Paddle steamer, Narrabeen is built by Mort's Dock & Engineering Company for the Port Jackson Steamship Company. Smaller than Brighton, she is mainly used on off-peak services and she is converted to a cargo vessel in 1911 as the newer "Binngarra-class" vessels are introduced.
- 1887 - The North Shore Ferry Company adsorbs the Neutral Bay Steam Ferry Company.
- 1889 - Charles Jeanneret sells his Parramatta River ferry interests to P Walker.
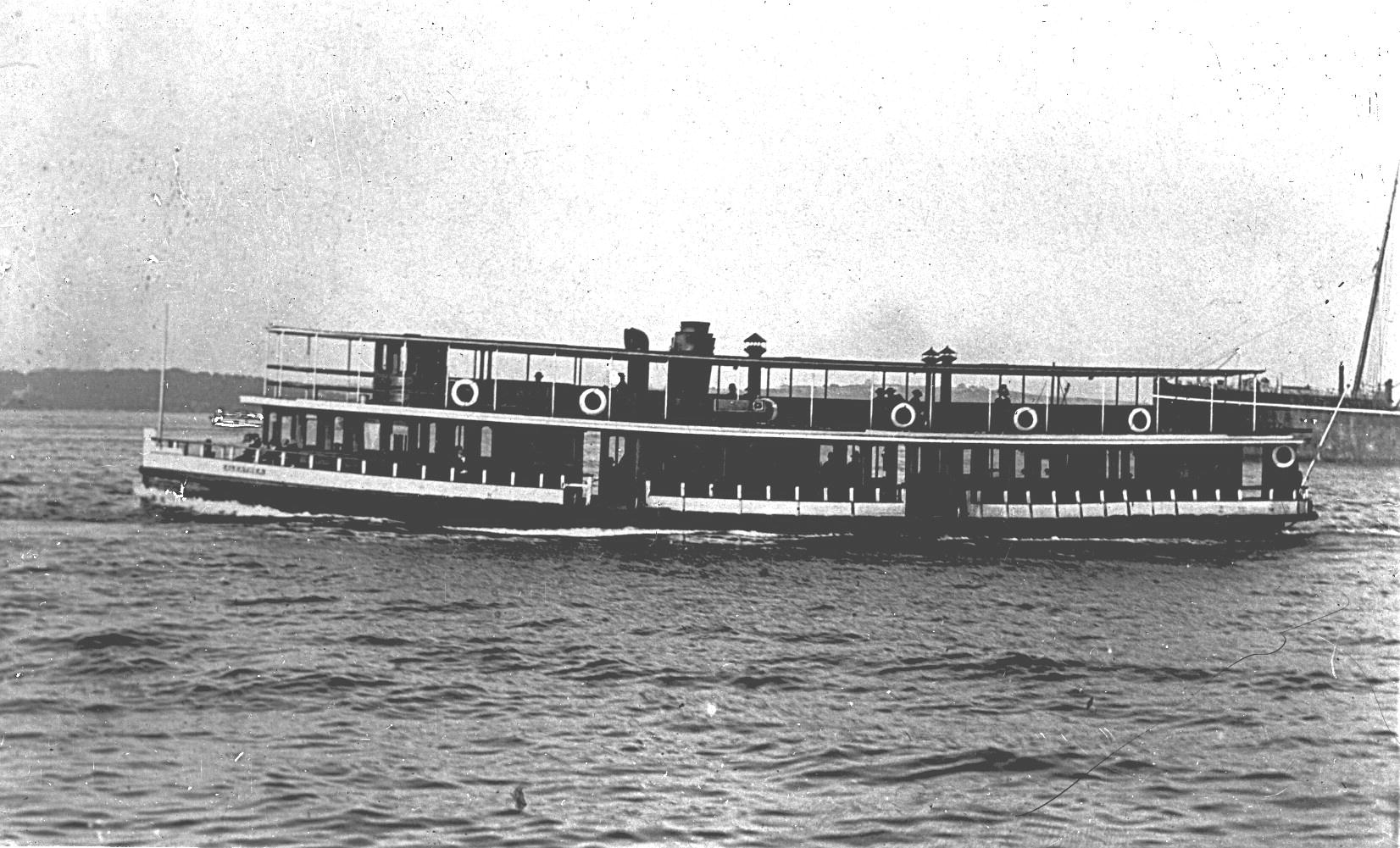
River ferry Aleathea (1881) - built as Sydney's second double-ended screw ferry, and the first with electric lighting.

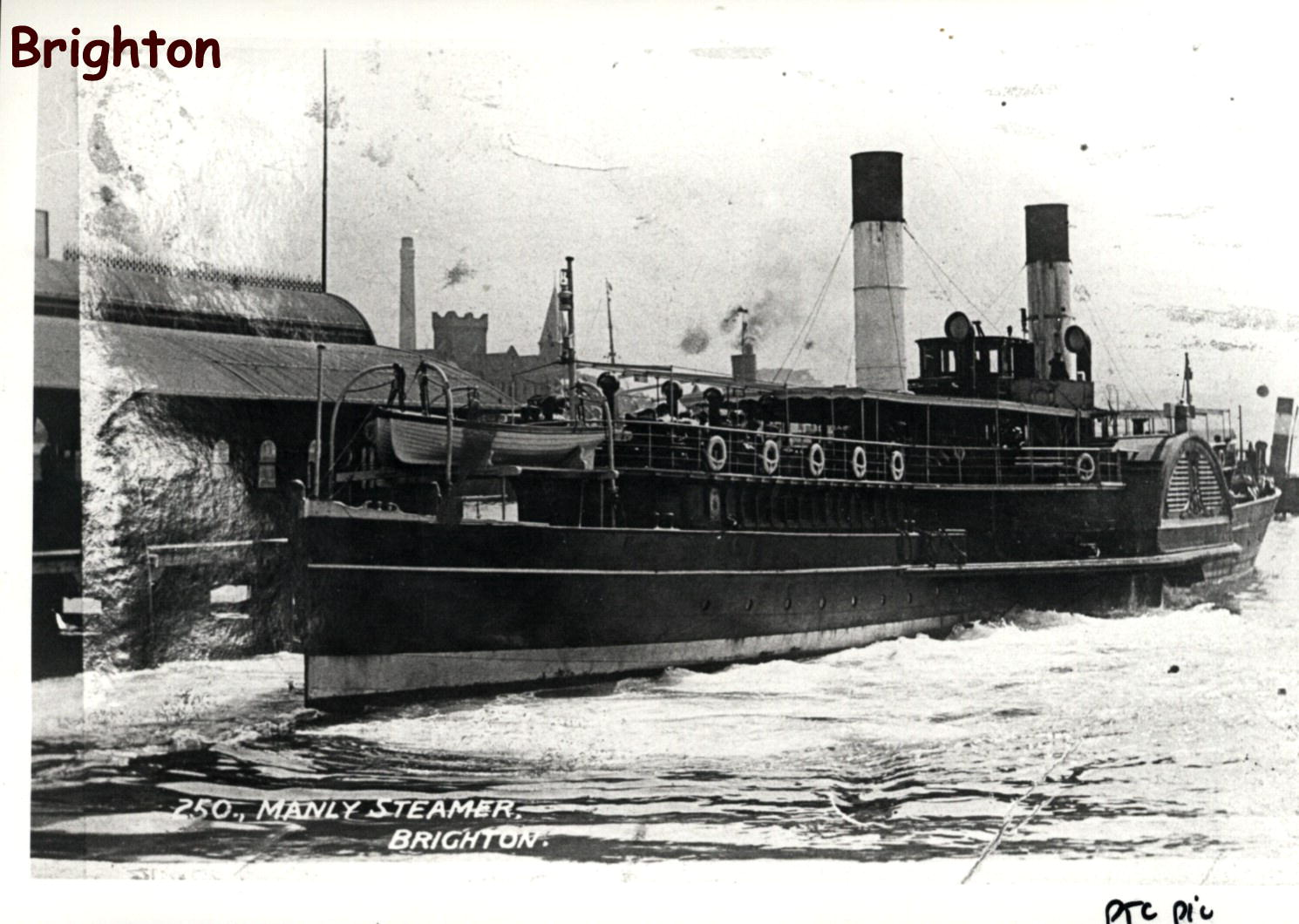
Opulent Manly ferry Brighton (1883-1916) was the largest paddle steamer ferry on Sydney Harbour

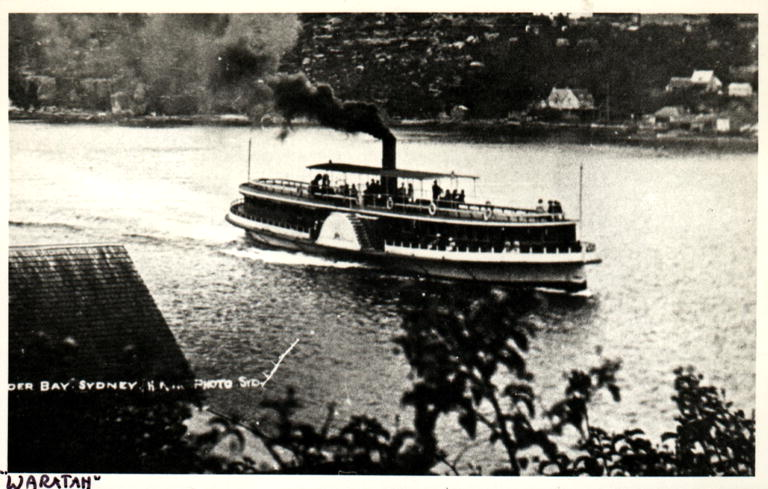
Paddle steamer Waratah in Lavender Bay circa 1886

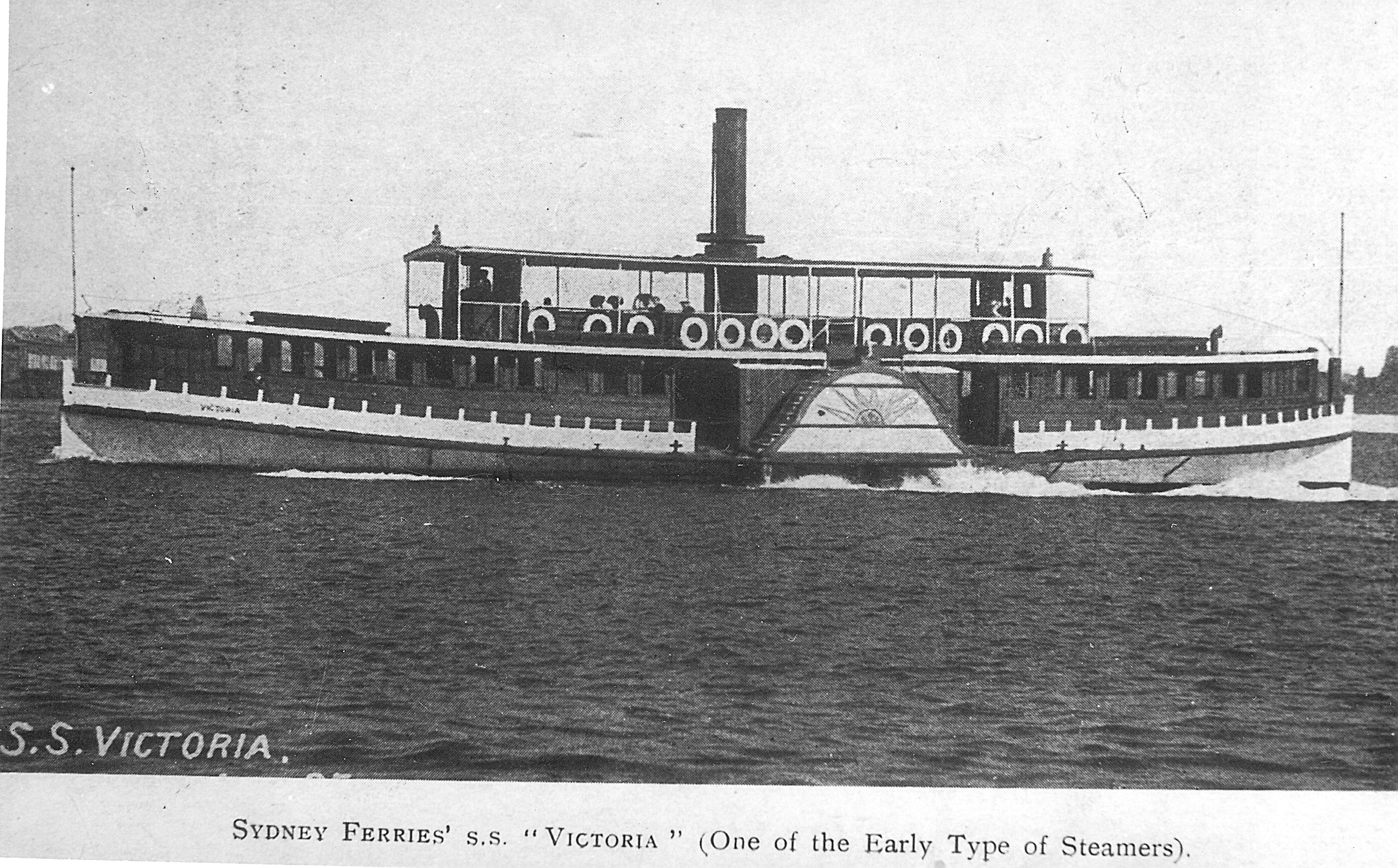
Victoria (built 1883) is typical of Sydney's double-ended inner harbour paddle steamer ferries of the late 19th century.

== 1890s ==
Circular Quay, 1890s

- 1892 - The Balmain New Ferry Company Limited is set up in competition to the Balmain Steam Ferry Company. The new competition and the 1890s recession see the new company take over the old in 1900. The company delivers The Lady Mary, the first of its Walter Reeks-designed double-ended "Lady-class" ferries. She is followed by The Lady Napier (1892), Lady Manning (1894), and Lady Hampden (1896). A further nine are built for the company between 1903 and 1914.
- 1893 - A limited liability company, the Parramatta River Steamers and Tramway Company Limited is formed. The company is taken over by Sydney Ferries Limited in 1901.
- 1893 - The Manly Co-operative Steam Ferry Company is formed in opposition to the Port Jackson Steam Boat Company. Supported by Manly Municipal Council and many residents, the new-comer pushes down fares making Manly excursions affordable to a broader class of people.
- 1893 - A train terminus is opened at Milsons Point connecting the North Shore railway line from Hornsby to the harbour, and along with the 1886 tram connection, serves a large catchment of commuters from across the North Shore for ferries across the harbour.
- 1896 - The Port Jackson Steamship Company adsorbs struggling rival Manly Co-operative Steam Ferry Company and is reincorporated as the Port Jackson Co-operative Steamship Company.
- 1896 - Manly (II) starts on the Manly run. Ordered by the Manly Co-operative Steam Ferry Company and designed by renowned naval architect, Walter Reeks, she is the first double-ended screw ferry on the Manly run and remains one of the fastest ferries to have worked on the run.
- 1899 - Thomas Henley takes acquires three vessels from the struggling Balmain Steam Ferry Company and commences services to Drummoyne and Haberfield. In 1900, the Balmain Steam Ferry Company is taken over by the Balmain New Ferry Company.
- 14 December 1899 - the North Shore Ferry Company is incorporated as Sydney Ferries Limited.
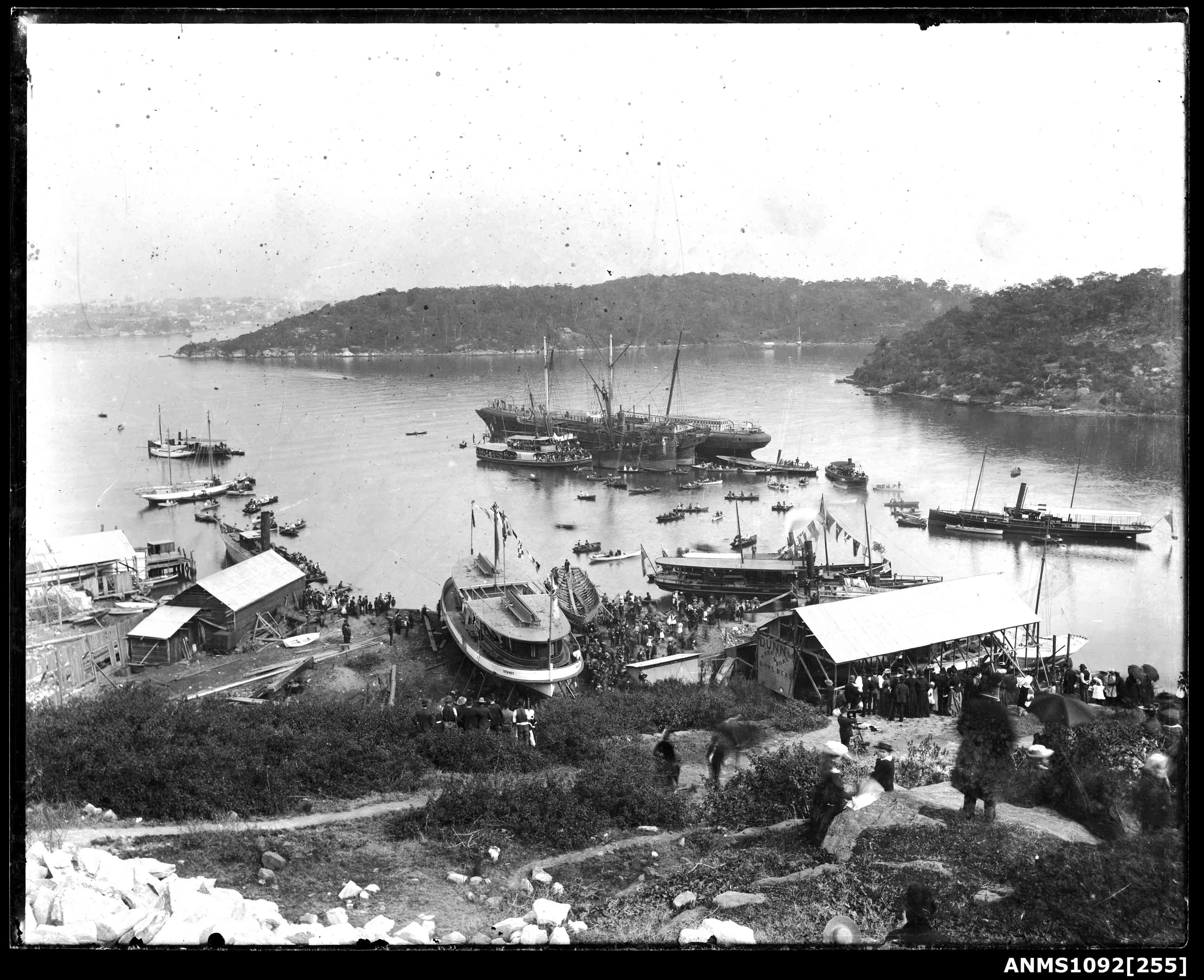
Launch of The Lady Mary at Berrys Bay, North Sydney, 1892, the first of a long series of "Lady-class" ferries

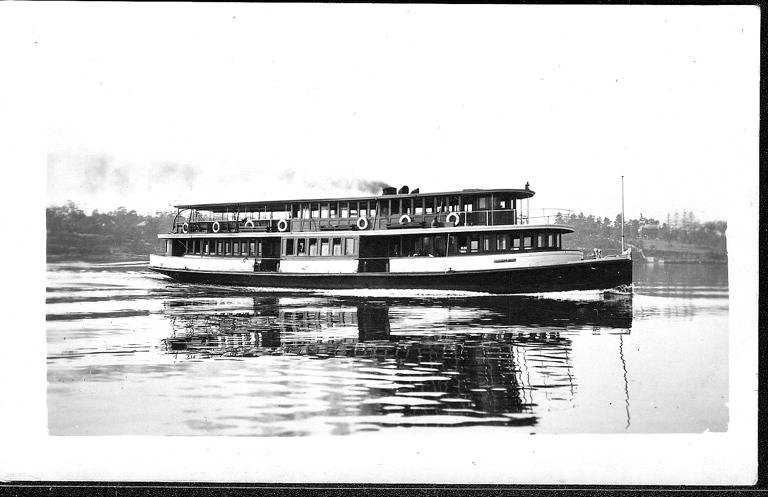
Bronzewing the largest of Sydney's single-ended ferries, and the last traditional 'river type' boat built for the Parramatta service.

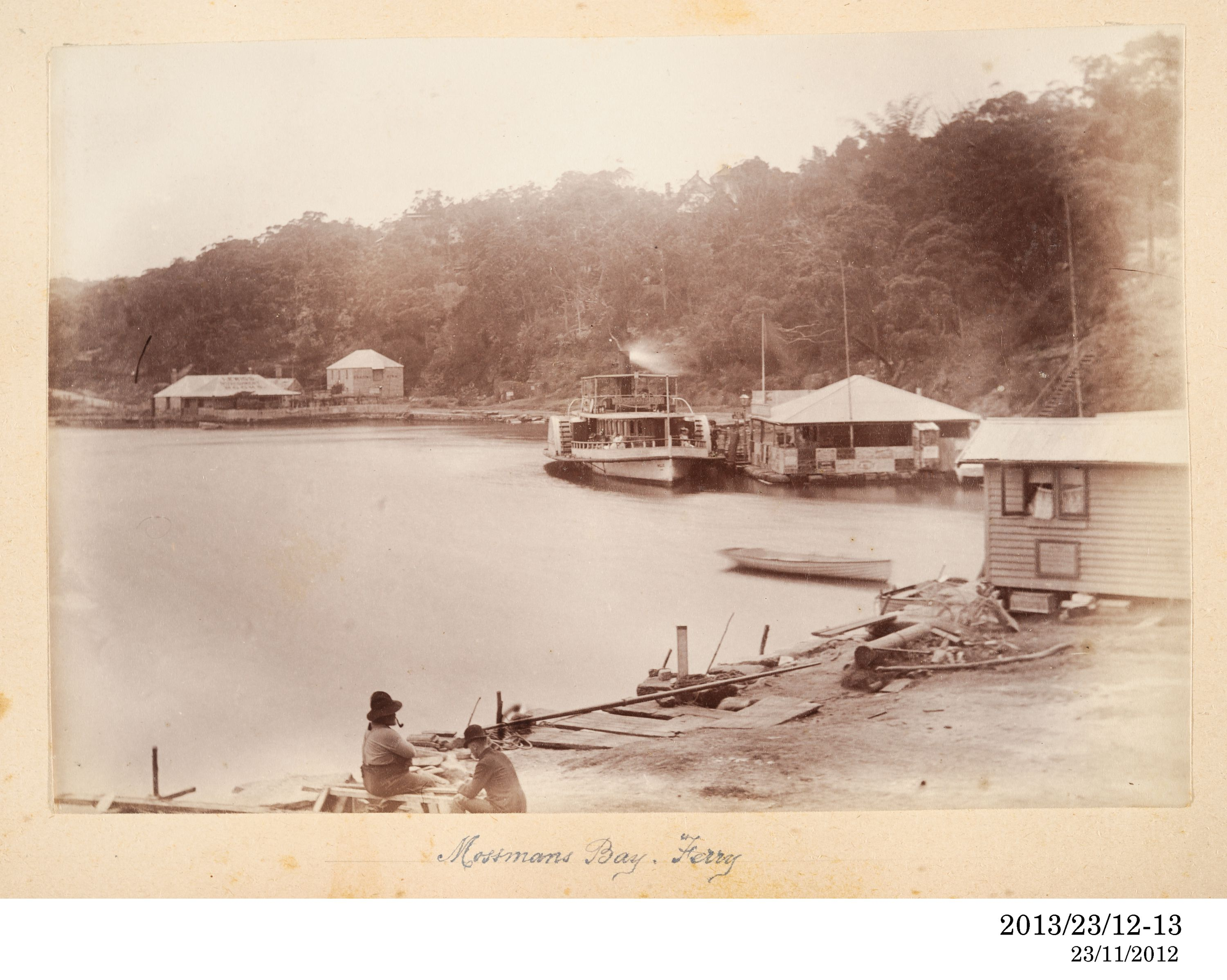
Paddle steamer Millie at Mosman Bay

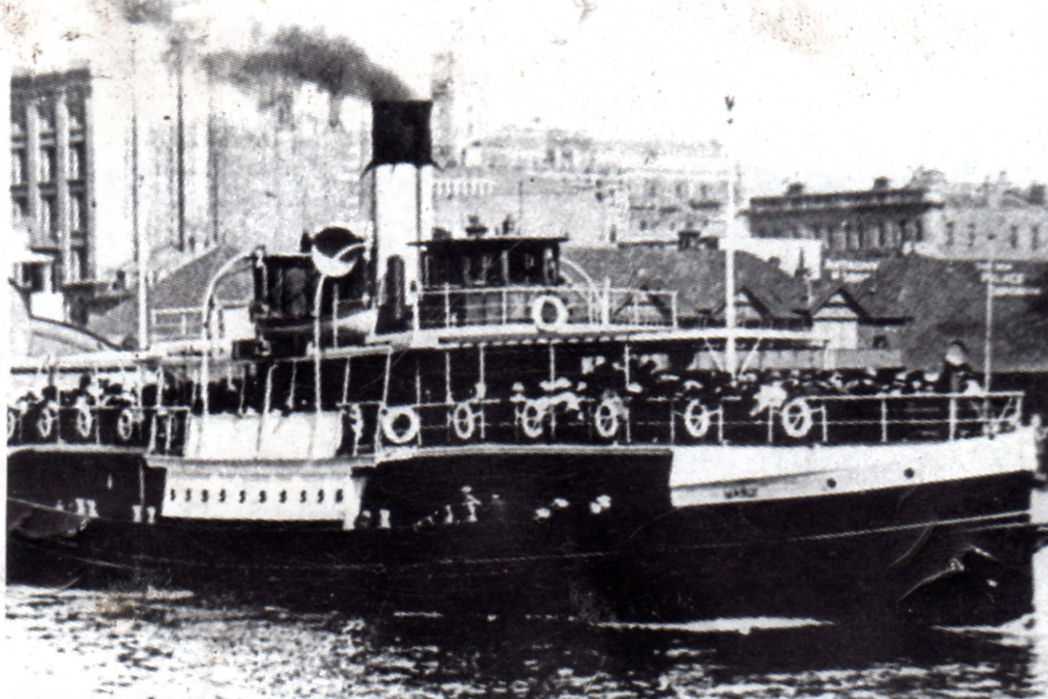
The fast Manly (II), designed by Walter Reeks, she is the first double-ended screw ferry on the Manly run.

== 1900s ==
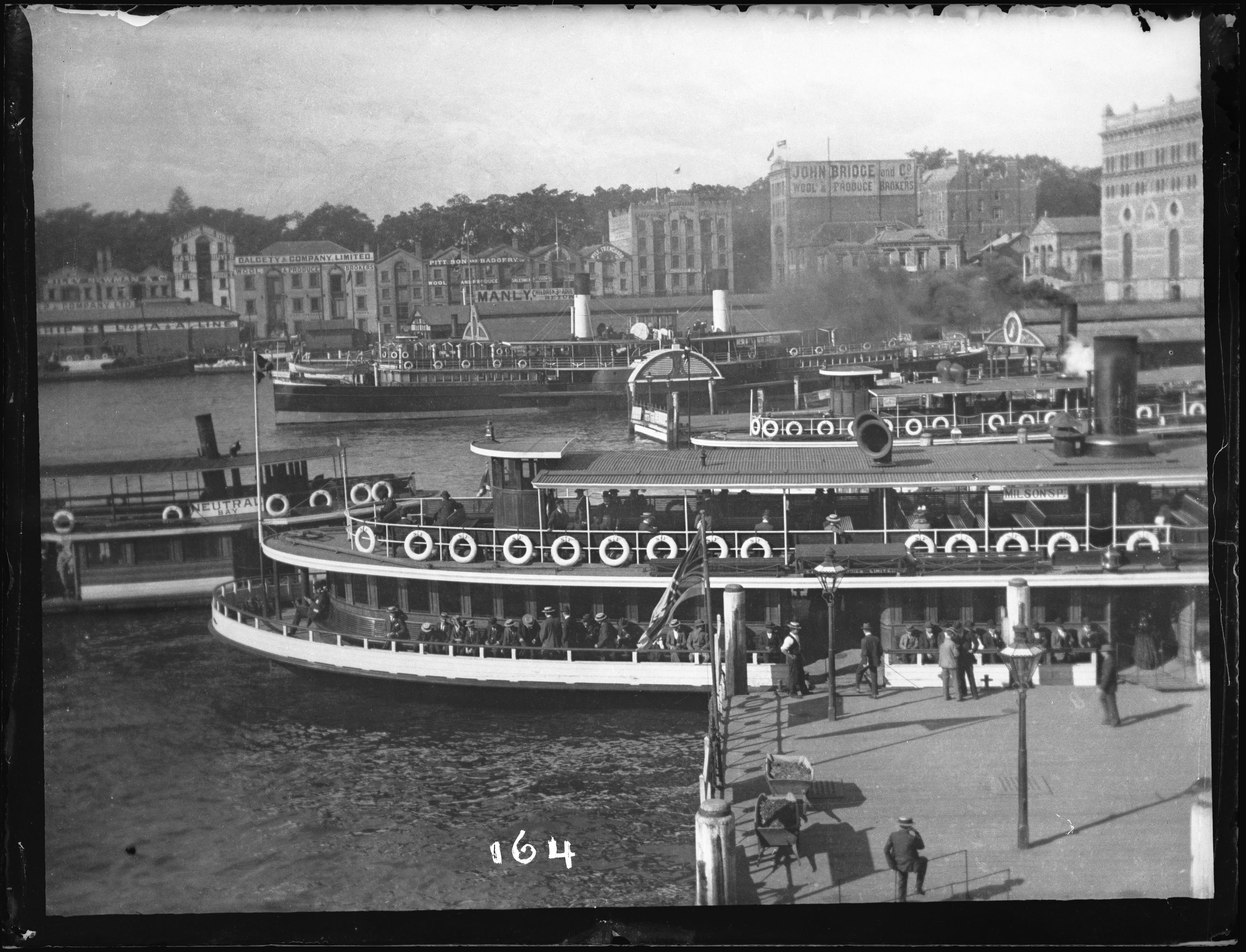
Circular Quay, 1900s

- 1900 - The Balmain New Ferry Company (formed 1892) takes over the Balmain Steam Ferry Company (formed 1882). The Balmain New Ferry Company, with naval architect Walter Reeks develops double-ended screw ferries with single screws pushing the vessel in one direction and pulling it in the other. This single "push-pull" configuration is seen in the timber "Lady-class" vessels.
- 1 January 1901 - The North Shore Steam Ferry Company is renamed Sydney Ferries Limited. It goes on to adsorb most of Sydney's ferry services, acquiring the Parramatta River Company in 1901, the New Balmain Ferry Company in 1917, and the Watsons Bay Ferry Company in 1920. Between 1900 and 1922, Sydney Ferries Limited will also acquire 25 large ferryboats, predominantly the "K-class" ferries. Such is the growth in demand for cross-harbour ferries prior to the opening of the Sydney Harbour Bridge, Sydney Ferries Limited becomes the world's largest ferry operator by fleet size and patronage.
- 1901 - Sydney Ferries Limited takes over the Parramatta River service with its acquisition of the Parramatta River Steamers and Tramway Co. Ltd.
- 1901 - Increasing demand on the vehicular ferry service from Milsons Point to Bennelong Point sees the Blues Point to Dawes Point vehicular service re-established.
- 1901 - The Walter Reeks designed Kuring-gai enters service on the Manly run. A steel, double-ended screw steamer, in appearance, size and capacity she will become the archetype of the familiar Manly ferries of the twentieth century.
- 1903 - The City terminus for Parramatta and Lane Cove River ferries is moved from Darling Harbour to number 6/7 jetty at Circular Quay. Jetties 4 and 5 are rebuilt for all North Shore services.
- 1905 - Sydney Ferries Limited begins services to Clifton Gardens, Balmoral, and The Spit.
- early 1906 - The Balmain New Ferry Company takes over the Joubert-run Lane Cove ferries. Sydney Ferries Limited takes over the service in 1917.
- 1906 - Binngarra, the first of six similar double-ended screw steamers, enters service for the Port Jackson and Manly Steamship Company. She will be followed by Burra Bra (1908), Bellubera (1910), Balgowlah (1912), Barrenjoey (1913), and Baragoola (1922). Bellubera, Baragoola, and Barrenjoey (renamed North Head in 1951) will serve until 1973, 1983, and 1985 respectively.
- 1906 - Sydney Ferries Limited purchases the Thompson estate at Clifton Gardens (in Mosman) including land, the three-storey hotel, wharf dancing pavilion and skating rink. The company builds a large circular swimming enclosure that holds 3,000 spectators, a boatshed and a tramway from the wharf to the hotel. The structure burns down in 1956.
- 1907 - The Port Jackson Co-operative Steamship Company is re-incorporated as the Port Jackson and Manly Steamship Company Limited.
- 1907 - Sydney Ferries Limited introduces the K-class ferry, Kookooburra. It represents the company's first attempt at a designing a Parramatta River ferry after taking over that service in 1901. The company follows up Kookooburra with a smaller but otherwise similar ferry, Kuranda (soon renamed Kaludah) in 1909. In 1911, Kaludah will burn out and sink in Tarban Creek becoming possibly the shortest-lived of all Sydney Harbour ferries.
- 1908 - The Upper Lane Cove River Ferry Co starts services on the Upper Lane Cove River between Figtree and Fiddens Wharf, West Killara.
- 1909 - With increasing commuter pressure on the Milsons Point terminus, a supplementary tram line is built to McMahons Point from which ferry services to the City also operate.
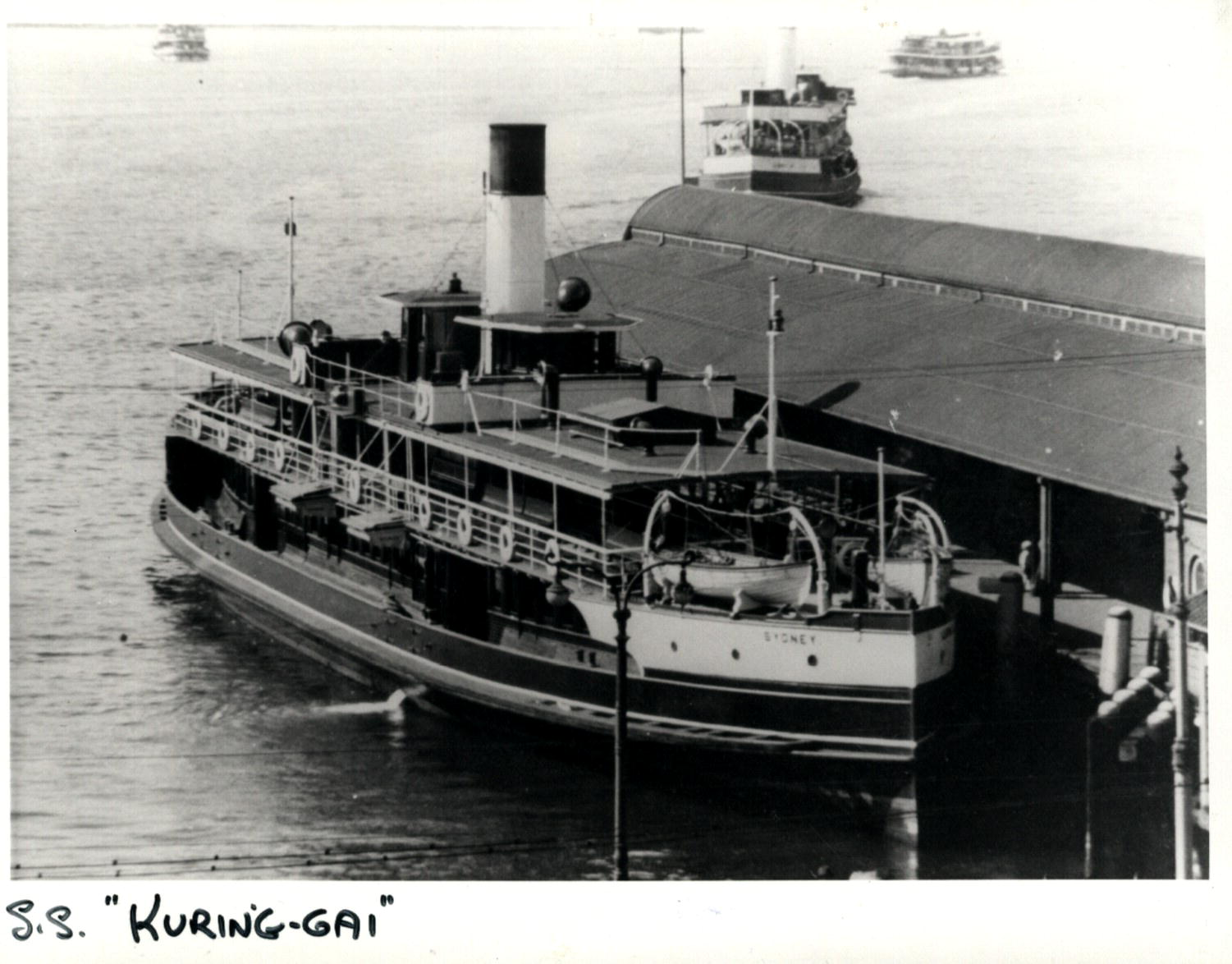
Kuring-gai, the archetype for the six "Binngarra-type" ferries.

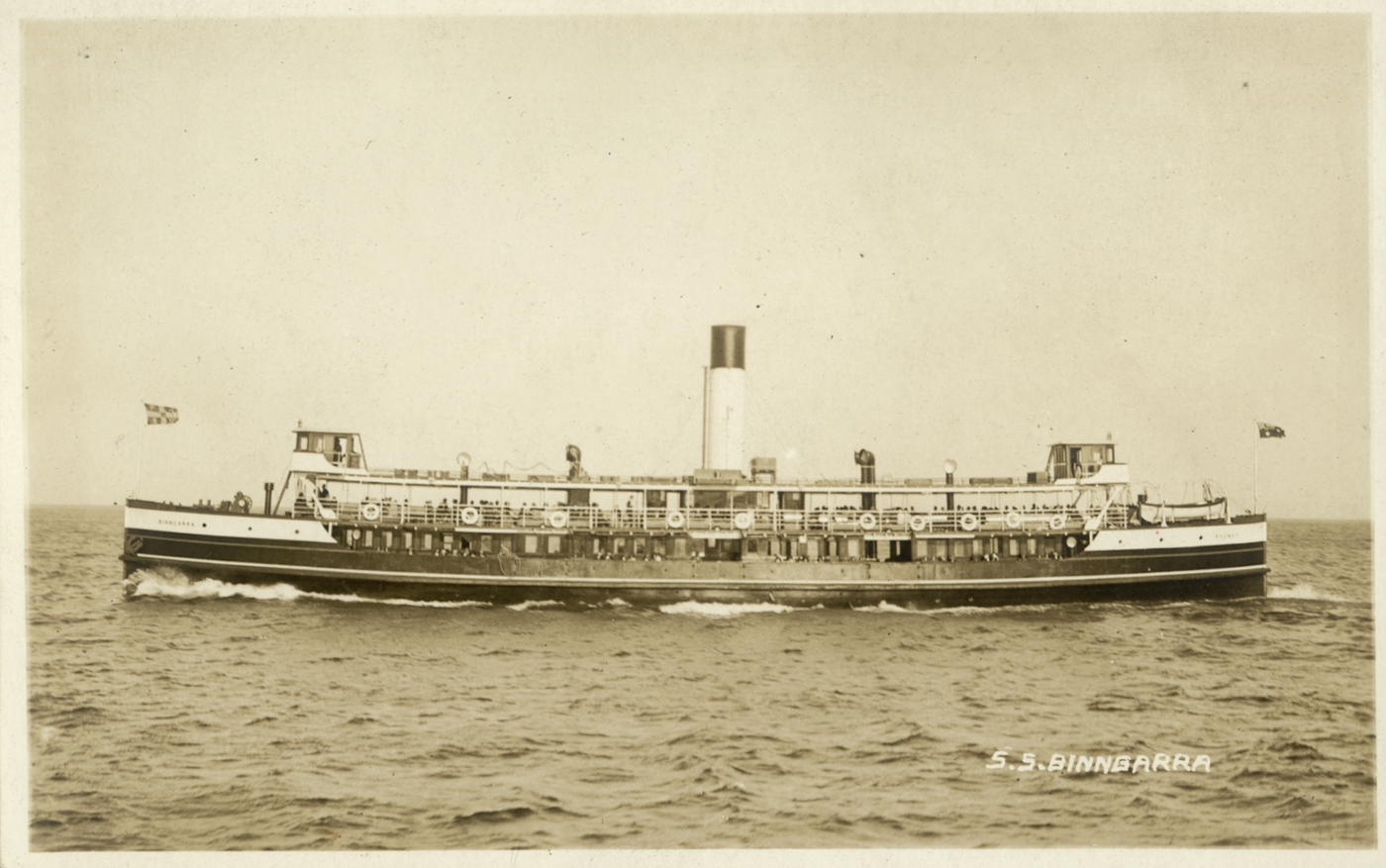
Binngarra (1906) enters service on the Manly run. She is the first of six similar Manly ferries, three of which will be ply the harbour until the 1970s and 1980s.

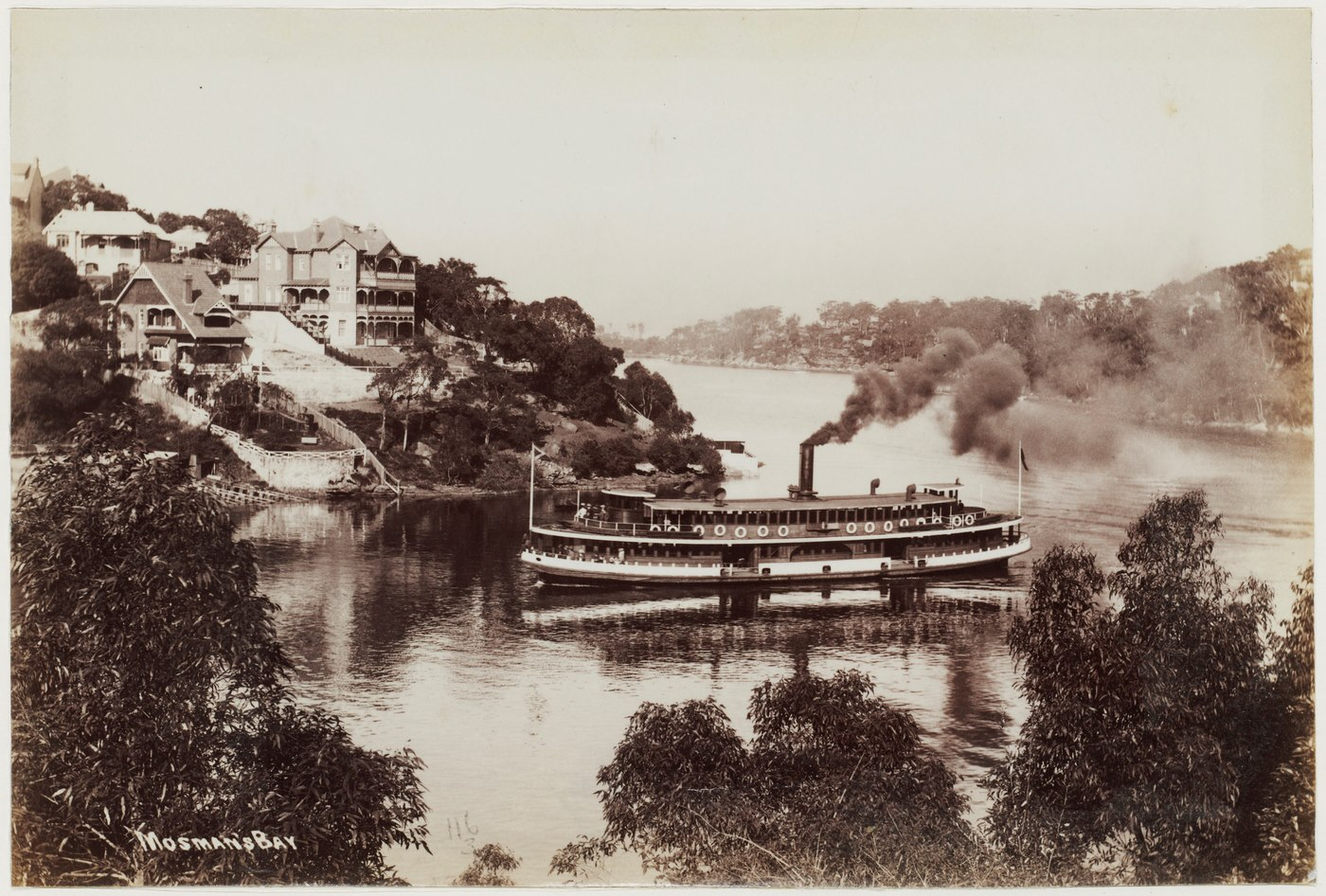
"K-class", Kummulla (1903-1934), arrives in Mosman Bay

The original Milsons Point station and ferry terminus at the site of current North Sydney Olympic Pool

== 1910s ==
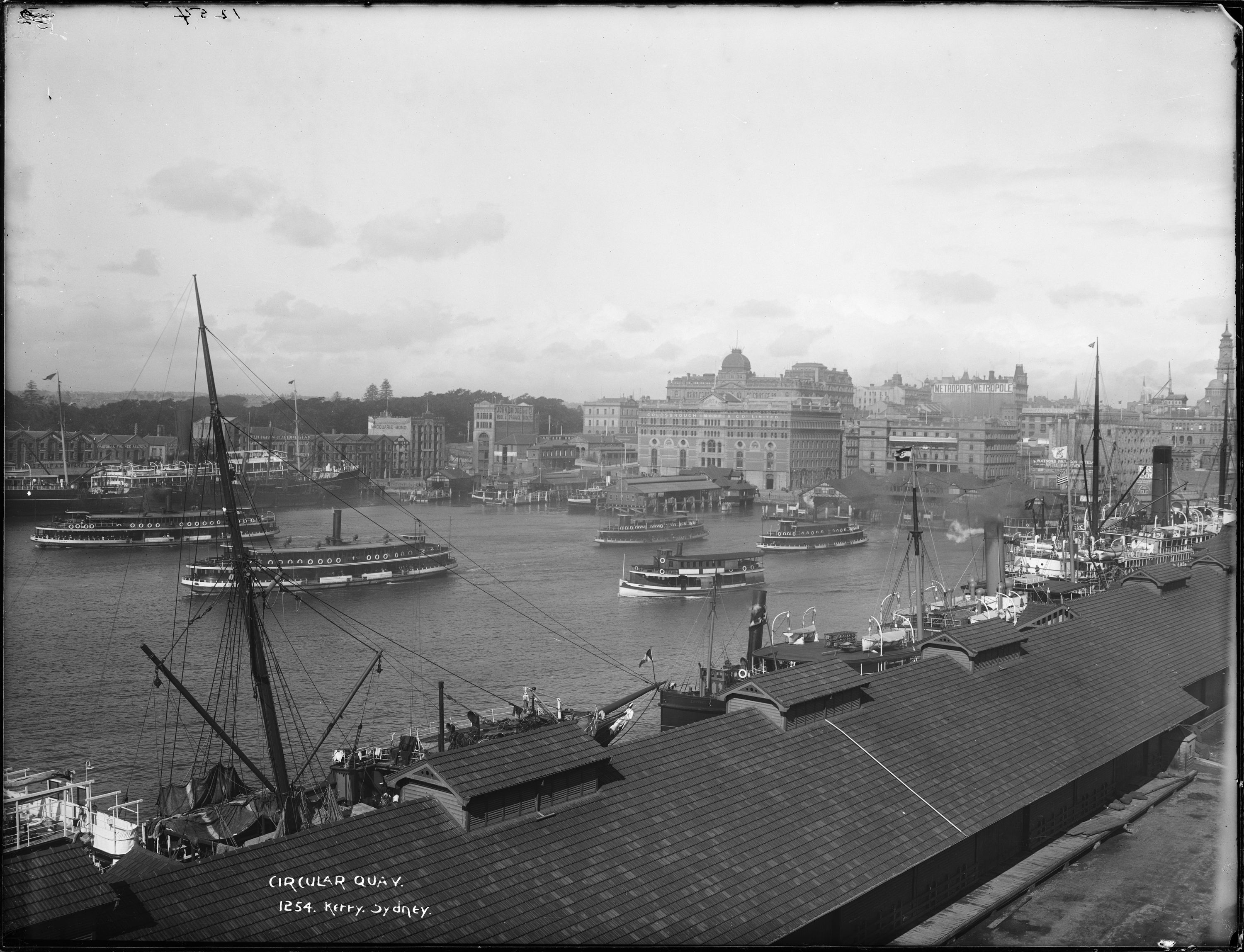
A busy early twentieth century pre-Bridge Circular Quay

- 1910 - Sydney Ferries Limited introduces Kirrule, one of the largest of their K-class ferries. She is followed by the near identical Kiandra in 1911 and Kubu in 1912 forming a sub-class known as the "Kirrule-type" ferry. Built for the busy Mosman run, they can carry 1,000 passengers each. The three survive the 1932 opening of the Sydney Harbour Bridge, and are decommissioned in the 1950s.
- 1910 - The Balmain New Ferry Company introduces Lady Chelmsford, which is the first of new series of "Lady-class" double-ended screw ferries. She is followed by the similar Lady Denman (1912), Lady Edeline (1913), Lady Scott (1914), and Lady Ferguson (1914). The five serve in various ferry routes until the late 1960s, 1970s and 1980s.
- December 1911 - Sydney Ferries Limited adds a service to meet the tram at the new Cremorne Point wharf.
- Summer 1912/13 - The Watsons Bay Company charters the steamer, JW Alexander, to run a service between Watsons Bay and Manly. The company orders a new ferry, Woollahra, which is specially designed for the service with high bulwarks and wheelhouses. However, upon her delivery in 1913, the new Watsons Bay to Manly service has proved unprofitable and is discontinued. Woollahra is instead used on the existing Circular Quay to Watsons Bay run.
- 24 September 1916 - Sydney Ferries Limited vehicular ferry, Kedumba, transports the elephant 'Jessi' across the harbour from the old Moore Park Zoo to the newly opened Taronga Zoo. Sydney Ferries Limited commences regular services to the Zoo thereafter.
- 1917 - Sydney Ferries Limited takes over the Balmain New Ferry Company and most of its fleet including the "Lady-class" ferries.
- 1918 - Sydney Ferries forms two subsidiaries to manage its cargo, lighterage and property businesses, which later merge to form Harbour Land and Transport Company Ltd.
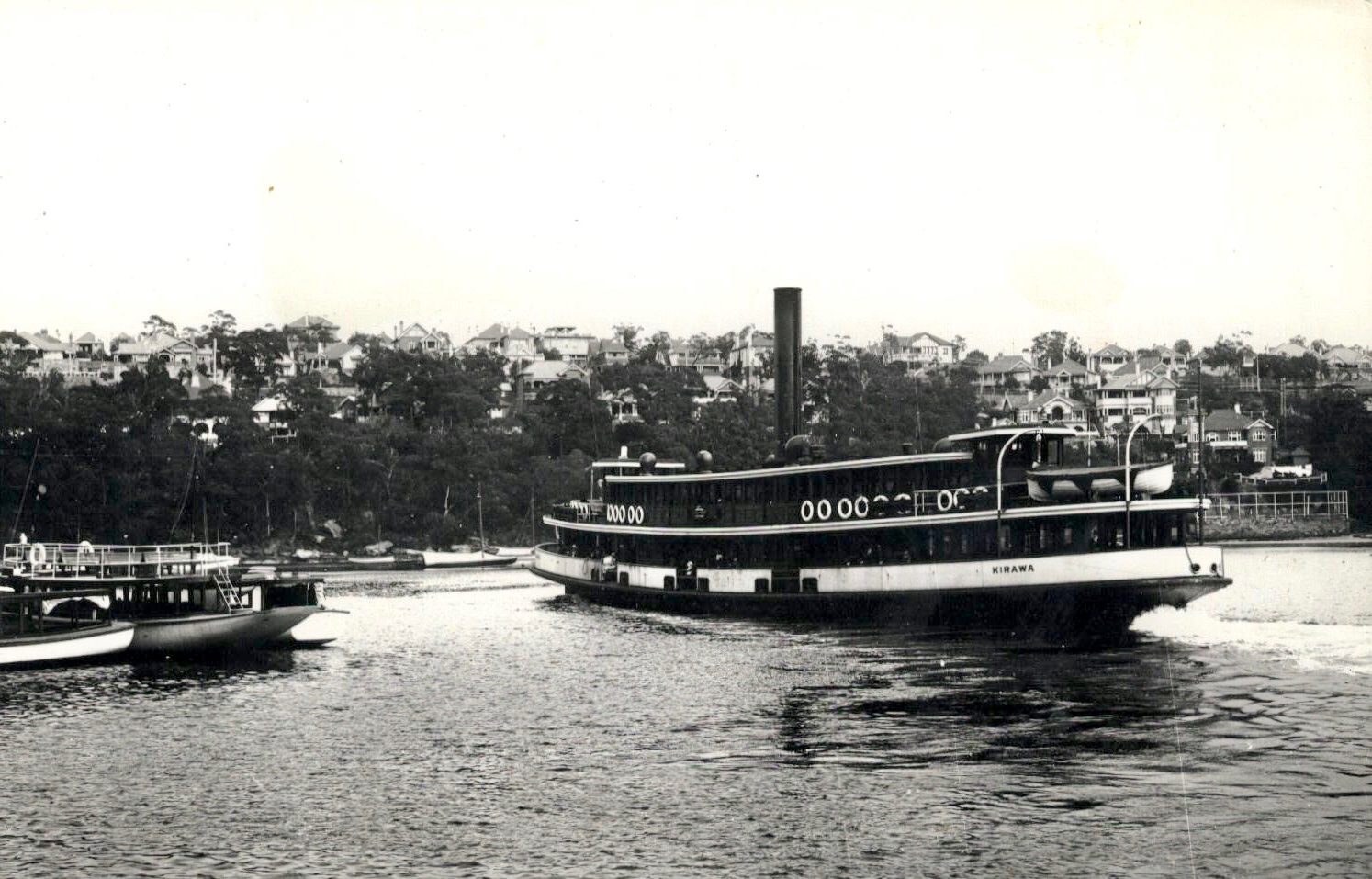
Kirawa leaving Mosman Bay wharf, 1915. Booming Mosman and neighbouring Cremorne had become one of the most fashionable Sydney suburbs, and after Manly and Milsons Point, the busiest ferry route.

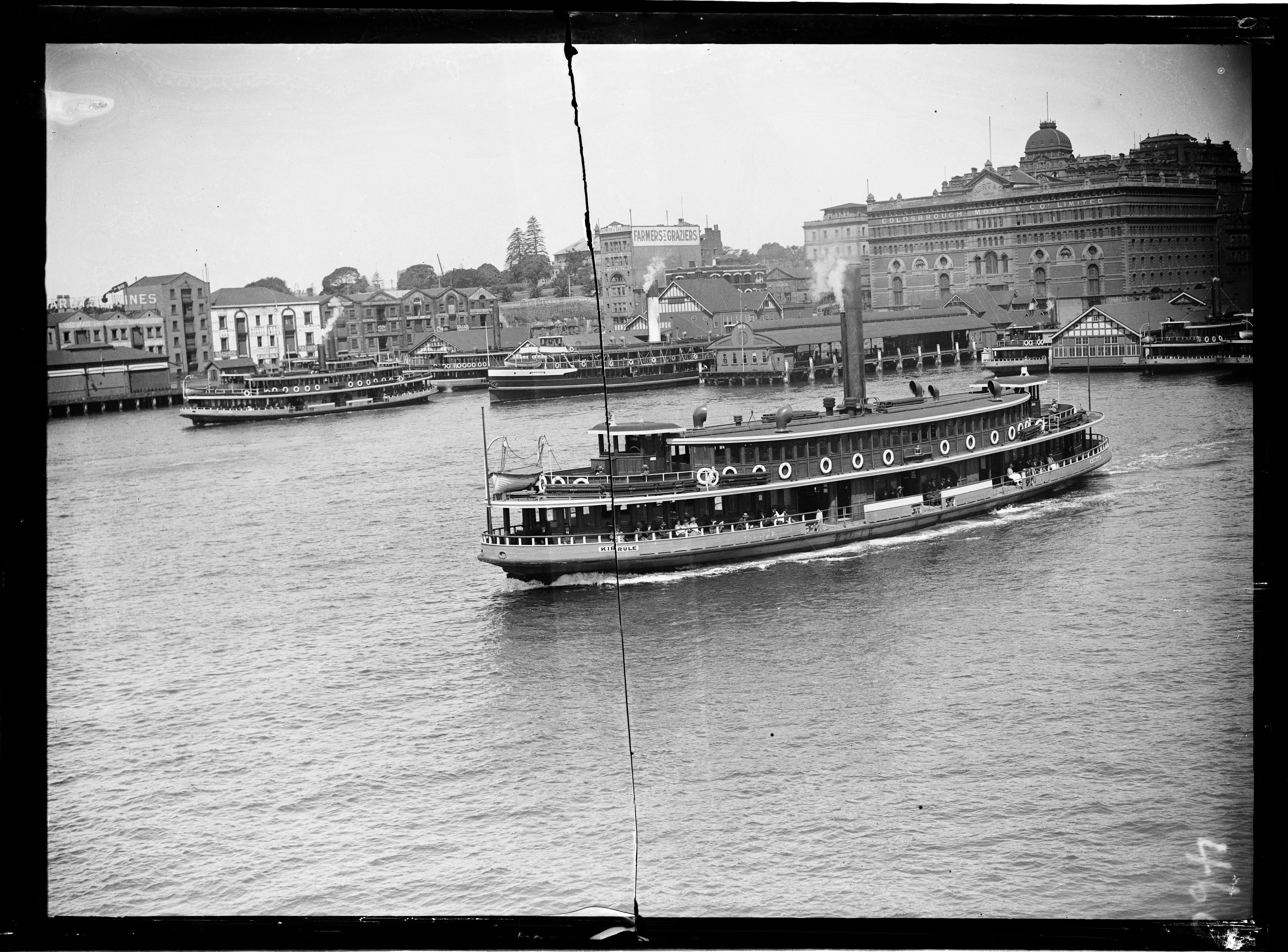
Kiandra, other K-class ferries and Barrenjoey at Circular Quay

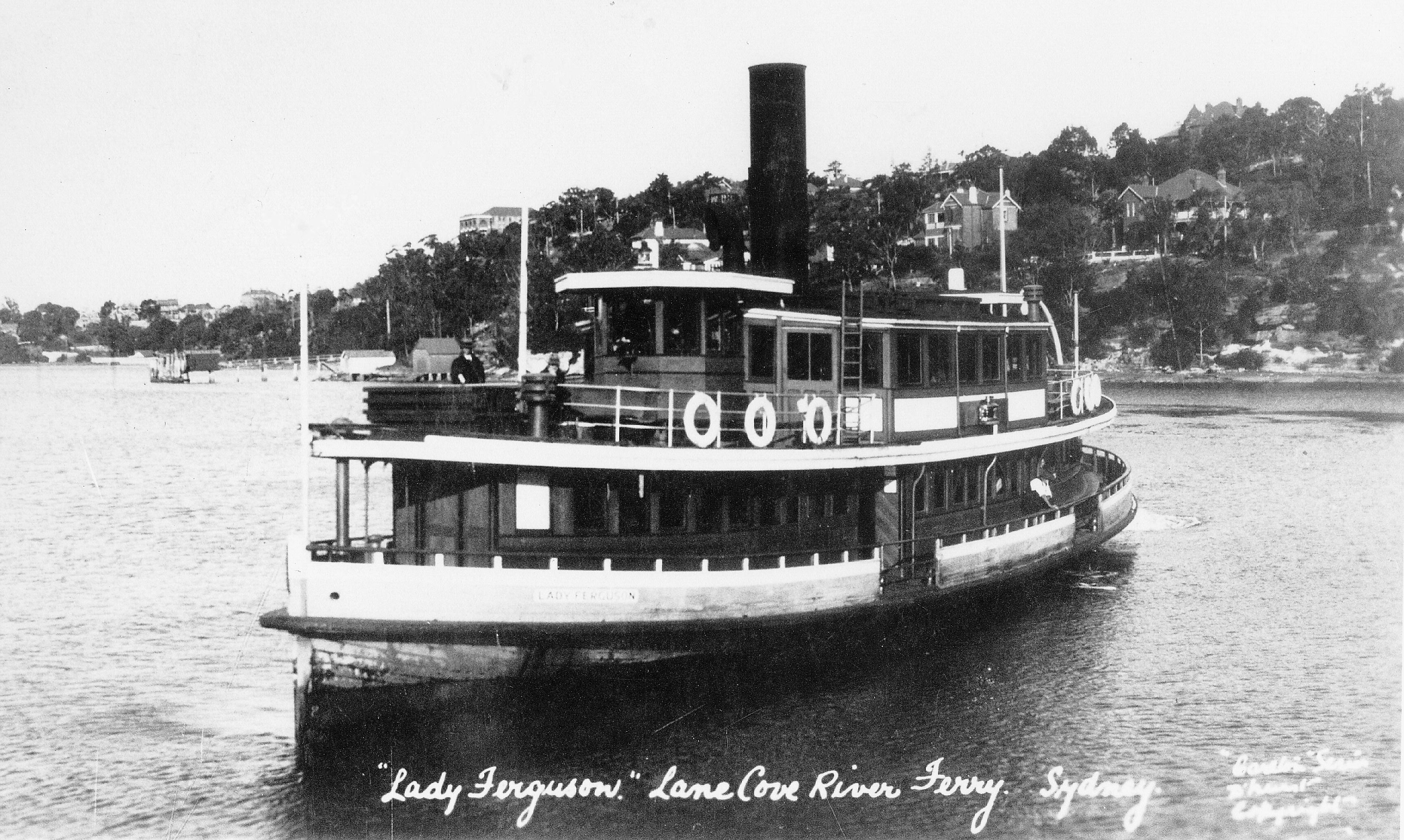
The 1914-built Lady Ferguson - one of five similar ferries - on the Lane Cove River

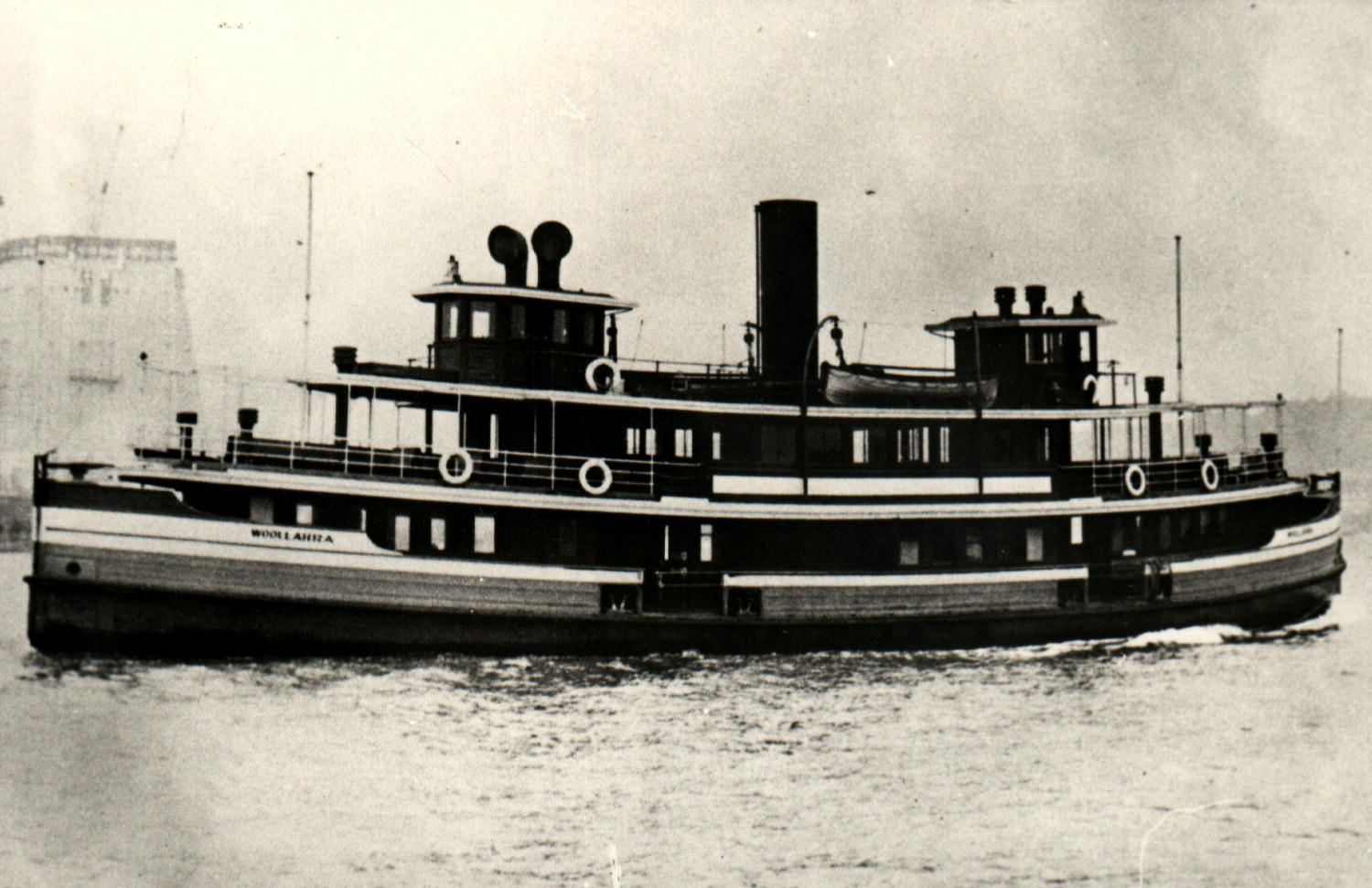
Woollahra (1913), with her high bows and wheelhouses, was built for a new Manly-Vaucluse service which was cancelled before she was commissioned.

== 1920s ==
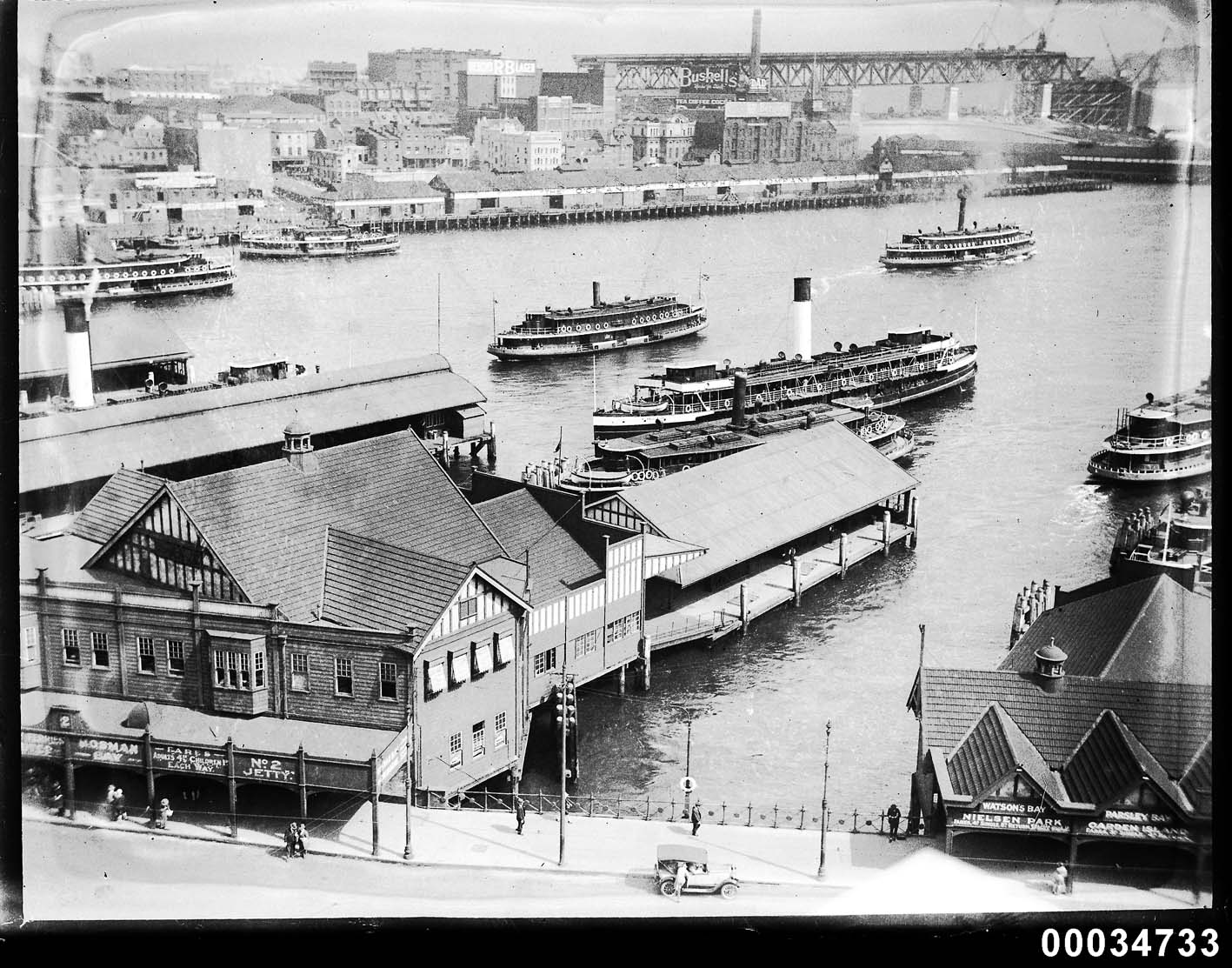
A busy Circular Quay in 1926 with K-class ferries inner harbour ferries and two "Binngarra-class" Manly ferries. Harbour Bridge construction is well-underway in the background.

- 1920s - Sydney Ferries Limited has a near a near monopoly on Sydney Harbour ferry services, except for the Manly ferry service and several small launch services. In addition to buying out most of the other ferry operators and their assets, between 1900 and 1914 the company acquired 25 large vessels - mostly of the type known as the K-class - on its own accord. Sydney Ferries Limited becomes the world's largest ferry operator in terms of both fleet size and patronage.
- 1920 - Sydney Ferries Limited takes over the Watsons Bay service and its four ferries, King Edward (1905), Vaucluse (1905), Greycliffe (1911), and Woollahra (1913).
- 1921 - Kooroongaba, the first of four larger cross-harbour vehicular ferries is added to the existing fleet of car ferries. She is followed by Koondooloo in 1924, and Kalang and Kara Kara in 1926.
- 1922 - To meet booming demand for cross-harbour services to Milsons Point, Sydney Ferries Limited commissions the Kuttabul and Koompartoo the largest capacity ferries ever on Sydney Harbour. For the rest of the 1920s, Sydney Ferries serves an historic peak in demand for cross-harbour services.
- 3 September 1922 - Baragoola, the last of six "Binngarra"-class ferries enters service. Being six metres shorter than her sisters and with a greater beam, she is slower than the previous five boats. She is converted from steam to diesel power in 1961 and is retired from ferry service in 1983.
- 1923 - Work commences on a bridge between Dawes Point and Milsons Point. The Milsons Point ferry/train/tram terminus is relocated.
- 1927 - The Watsons Bay ferry, Greycliffe, is struck and sunk by the liner RMS Tahiti. 40 ferry passengers are killed in the disaster.
- 1928 - Sydney Ferries Limited ceases Parramatta River services beyond Gladesville due to train and road competition. A Sydney Ferries Limited subsidiary maintains a cargo service to Parramatta until 1941.
- 1928 - Two new steamers, Dee Why and Curl Curl, are built in Scotland for the Manly run. Travelling to Sydney under their own steam, they are the largest ferries on Sydney Harbour until the 1938 introduction of the South Steyne. Reaching 17.6 knots on her trials, Curl Curl is considered to have been the fastest mono-hull ferry on the harbour.
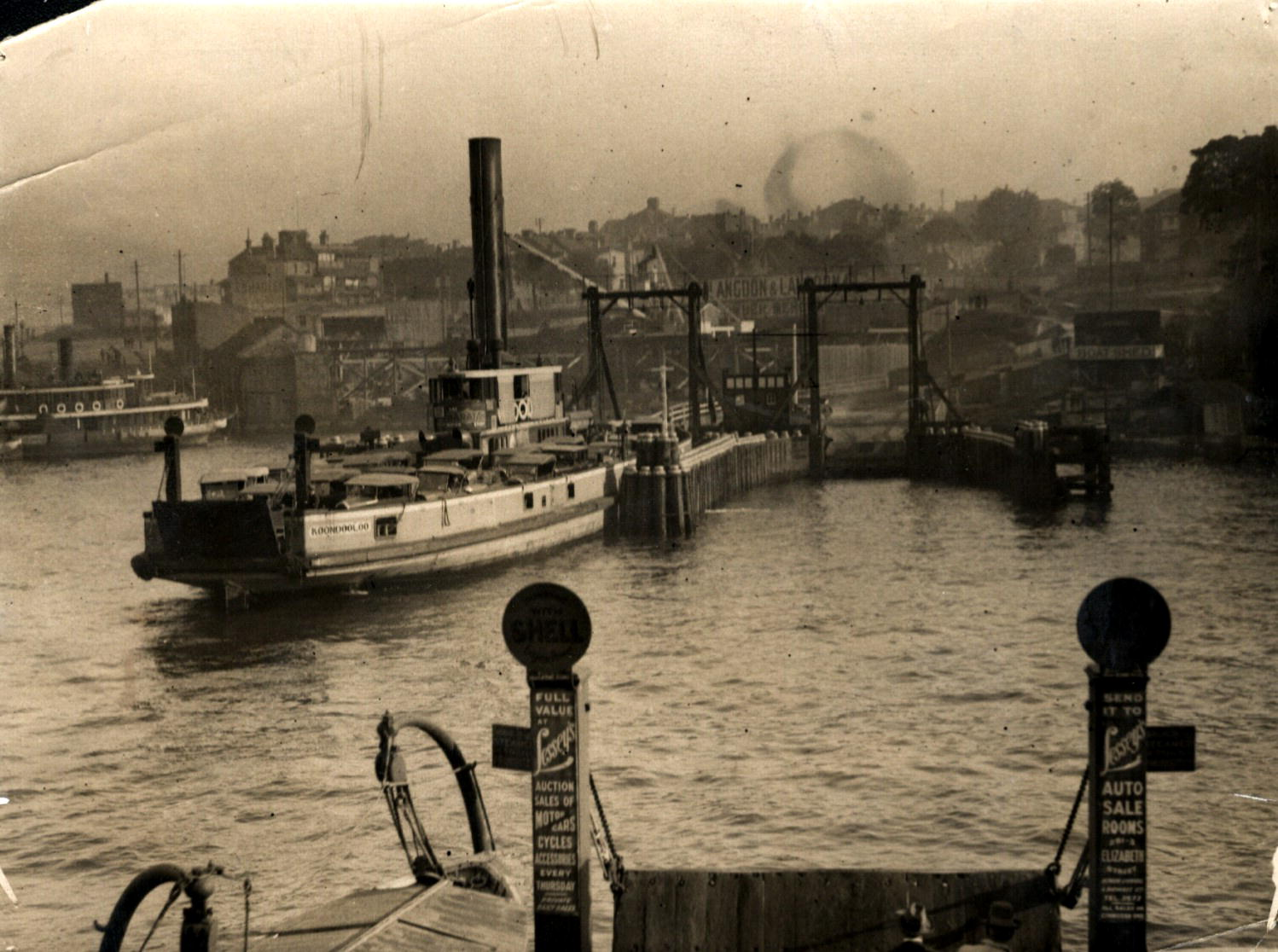
Vehicular ferry, Koondooloo, at Jeffrey Street Wharf, Kirribilli circa 1925. All vehicular ferries ceased service with weeks of the 1932 Sydney Harbour Bridge opening.

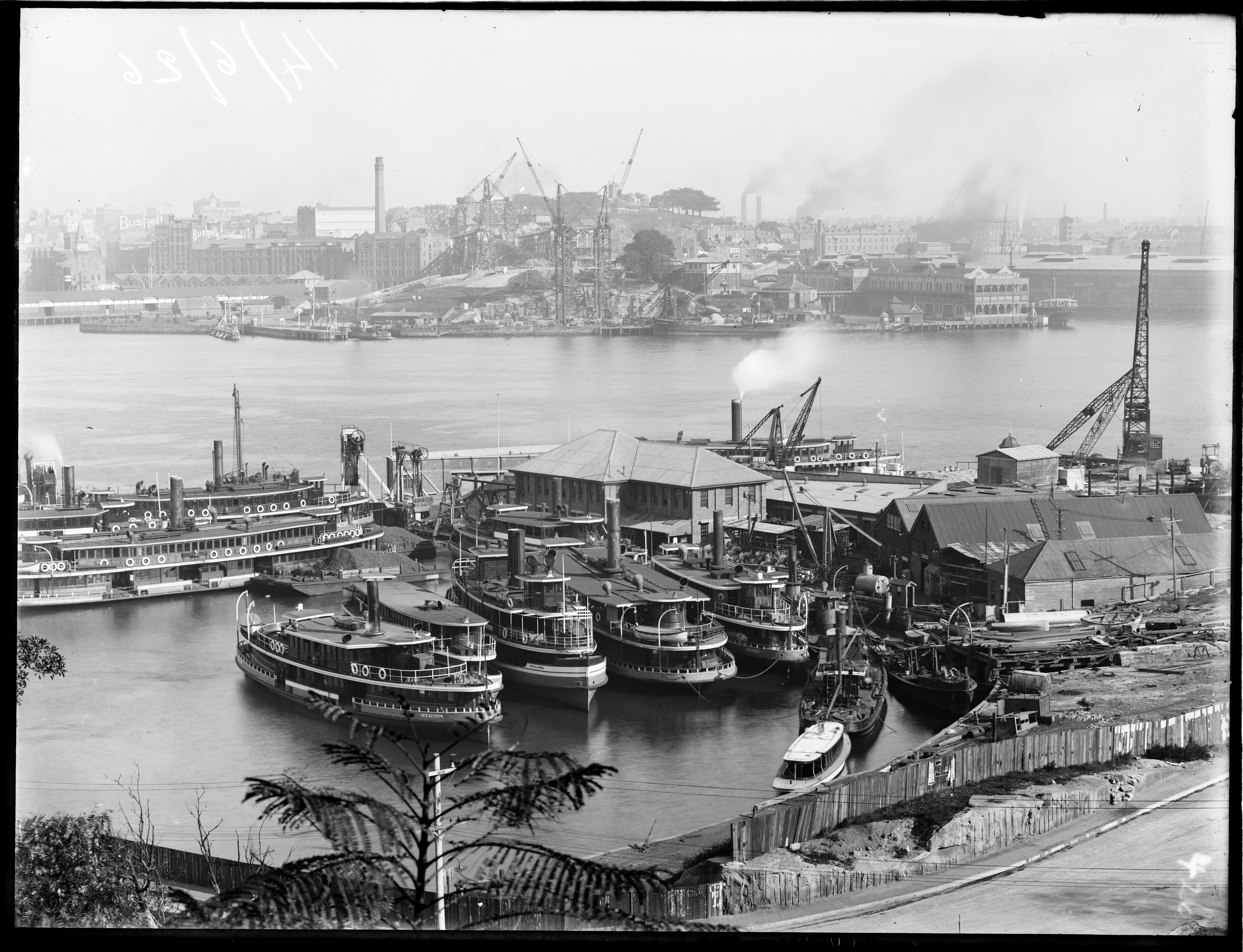
Sydney Ferries Limited base at Milsons Point with early Sydney Harbour Bridge construction underway at opposite Dawes Point

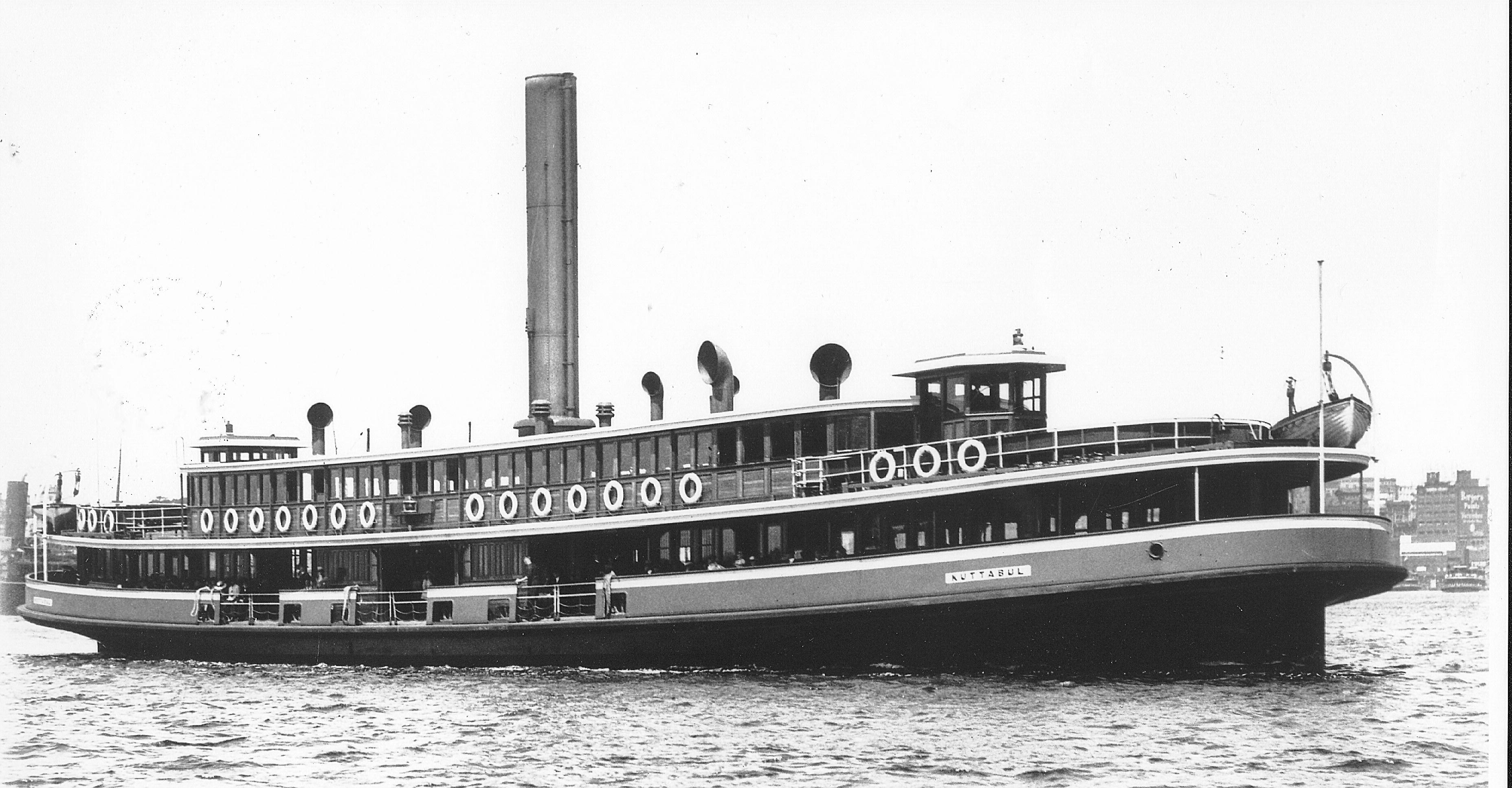
Built to meet the pre-Sydney Harbour Bridge demand across the harbour, Kuttabul and her sister Koompartoo could carry over 2,000 passengers, more than any Sydney ferry before or since.

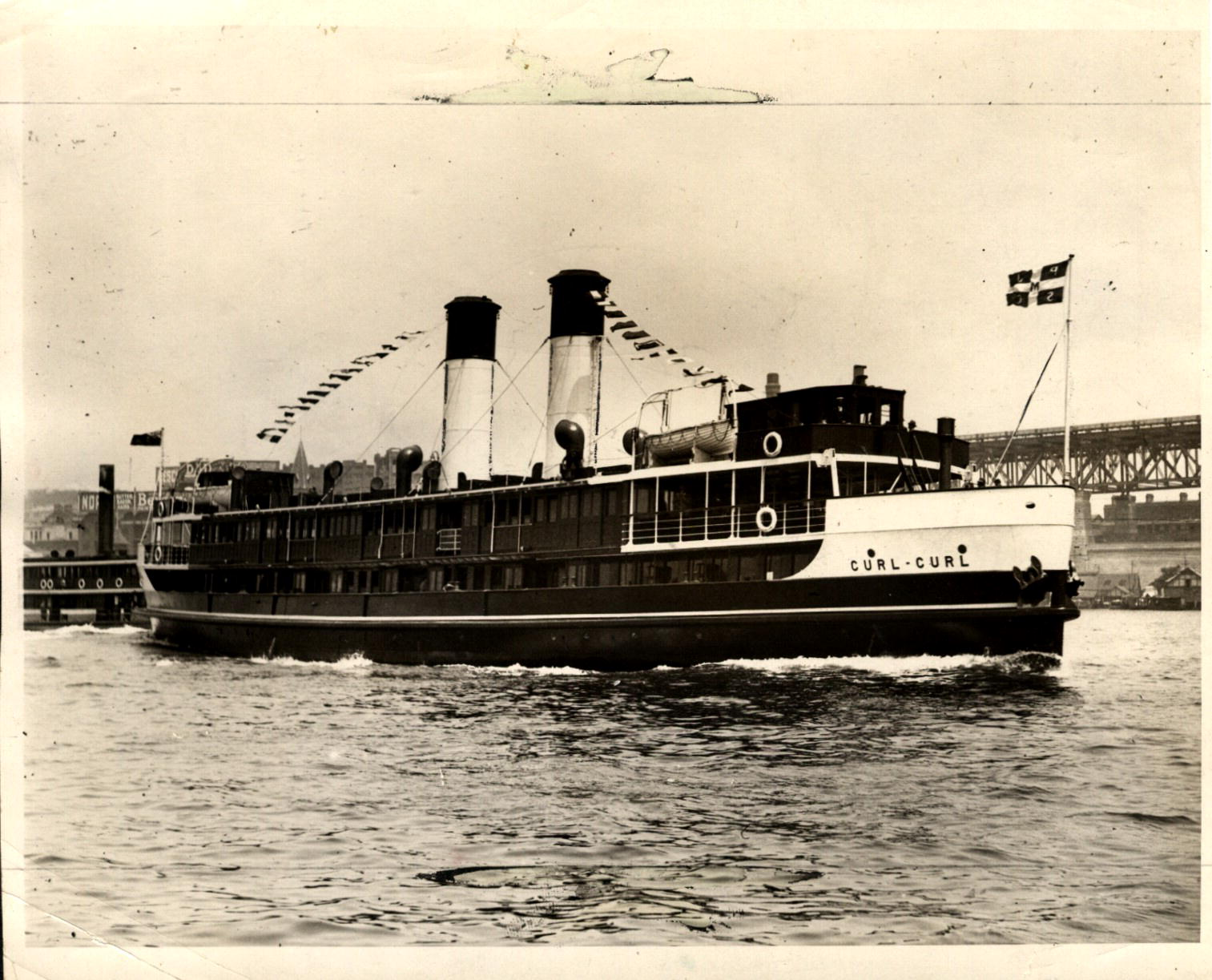
Curl Curl leaves Circular Quay on her first official trip to Manly, 1928

== 1930s ==
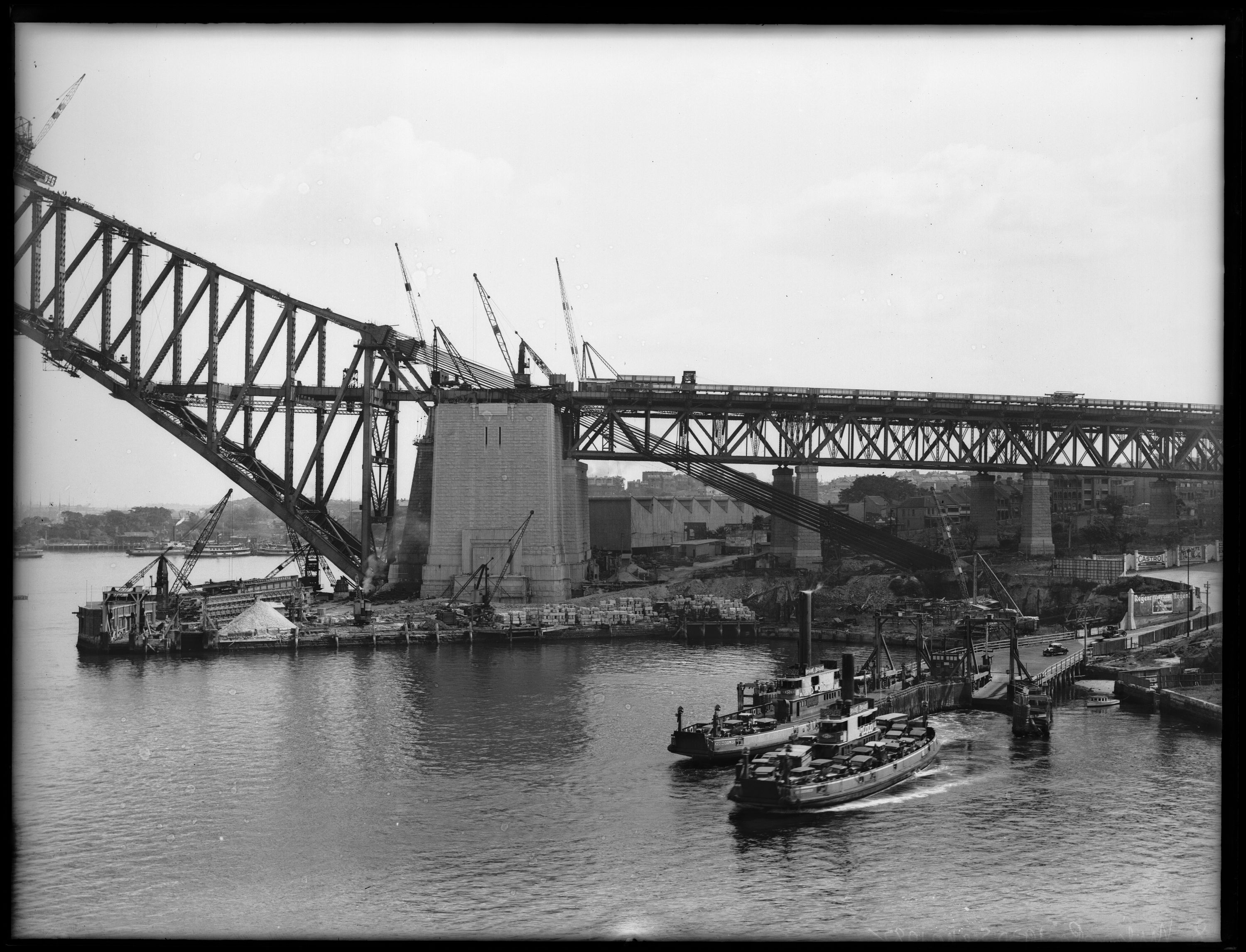
Vehicular ferries, Koondooloo and Kooroongaba at Jeffrey Street wharf, Kirribilli, with the Sydney Harbour Bridge under construction behind, 1930.

- 19 March 1932 - The Sydney Harbour Bridge opens. Annual passenger numbers decrease from 40 million to fourteen million. Sydney Ferries Limited services to Milsons Point and vehicular services cease. Over the next two years, Sydney Ferries pulls 18, mostly older, ferries from service. Those retired include all vehicular ferries, the older first class of "Lady-class" ferries acquired from the Balmain Company, and a number of the older K-class ferries. Also withdrawn are the large and relatively new Koompartoo and Kuttabul from the redundant Milsons Point route. They are used mainly for concert and showboat work until the outbreak of World War II.
- late March and early April 1932 - Vehicular ferry services between Dawes Point and Blues Point, and between Bennelong Point to Milsons Point cease less than two weeks after the bridge's opening. The 350-ton vehicular ferries, Koondooloo (1924), Kalang (1926) and Kara Kara (1926) are laid up. Other vehicular ferries are scrapped, however, Kooroongaba went to work crossing the Hunter River between Stockton and Newcastle. In the mid-1930s, demand for harbour cruises increases and the company fits out Koondooloo as a two-deck showboat. Such is her success, that Kalang is similarly fitted out as a three-deck showboat, and a third deck is later added to Koondooloo.
- 1932/33 - The Port Jackson Company builds a large harbour pool and pavilion at Manly Cove. The pool structure is destroyed in a 1974 storm and is not rebuilt.
- 1933 - Watsons Bay services cease with those ferries being disposed of or placed on other runs.
- 1933 - In attempt to modernise the fleet, Lady Chelmsford is converted from steam to diesel propulsion. A Gardner diesel, two strike five-cylinder provides 190 hp (141 kW) and 10.3 knots. Conversion of the remaining four "Lady-class" ferries and Karingal and Karrabee takes place over the 1930s. In line with the modernisation drive, the varnished timber finishes of the Sydney Ferries Limited fleets are painted over in a green and gold scheme.
- 16 November 1936 - a fire destroys Bellubera's timber superstructure while she is moored at the Kurraba Point depot. Two crew members die. She is rebuilt at the Cockatoo Island Dockyard and re-enters service in October 1937.
- 12 February 1938 - Rodney capsizes and sinks with the loss of nineteen lives. The ferry is top-heavy carrying well-wishers on its rooftop deck fare-welling the heavy cruiser USS Louisville from the harbour.
- 1938 - Scottish-built South Steyne enters service on the Manly run. She is the largest steam ferry to have worked on Sydney Harbour and will become arguably the most famous of all Sydney Harbour ferries. Only the current "Freshwater-class ferries" are larger although their passenger capacities are significantly less.
- 1939 - Nicholson Brothers Harbour Transport Pty Ltd takes over the Balmain services operating out of Erskine Street Wharf until 1964 when services are moved to Circular Quay.
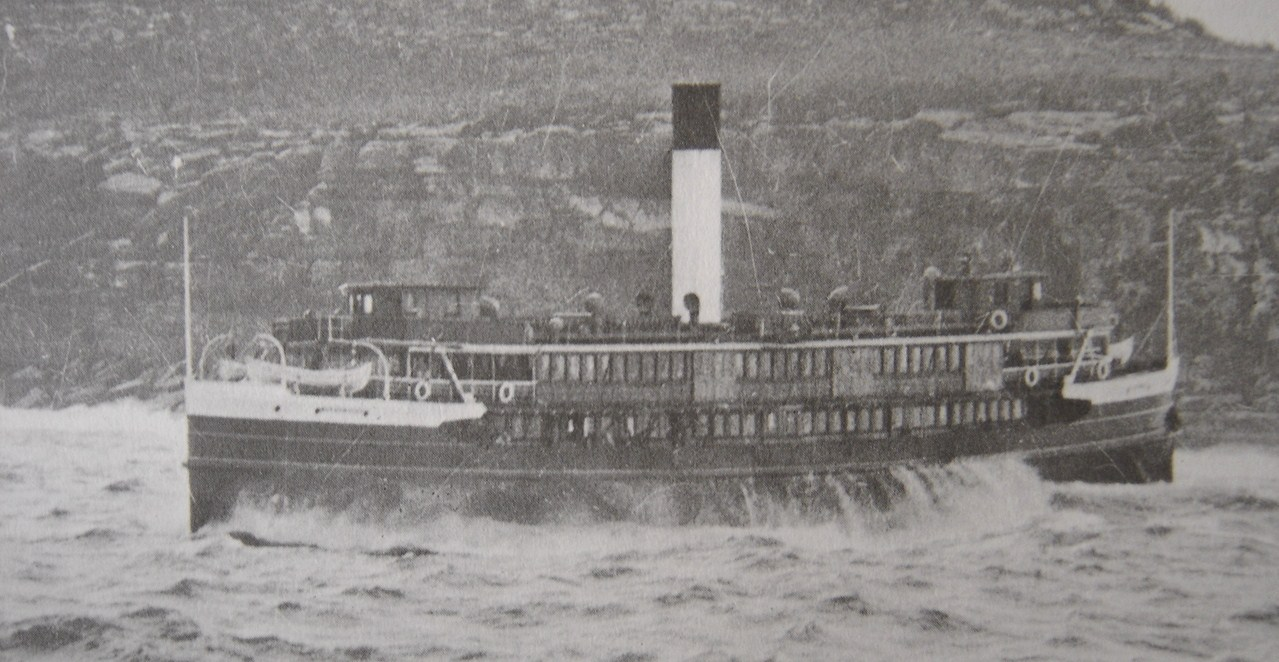
Manly steamer Barrenjoey (later converted to diesel and renamed North Head) crosses the Sydney Heads after her 1930s enclosing of her upper deck and wheelhouse extensions.

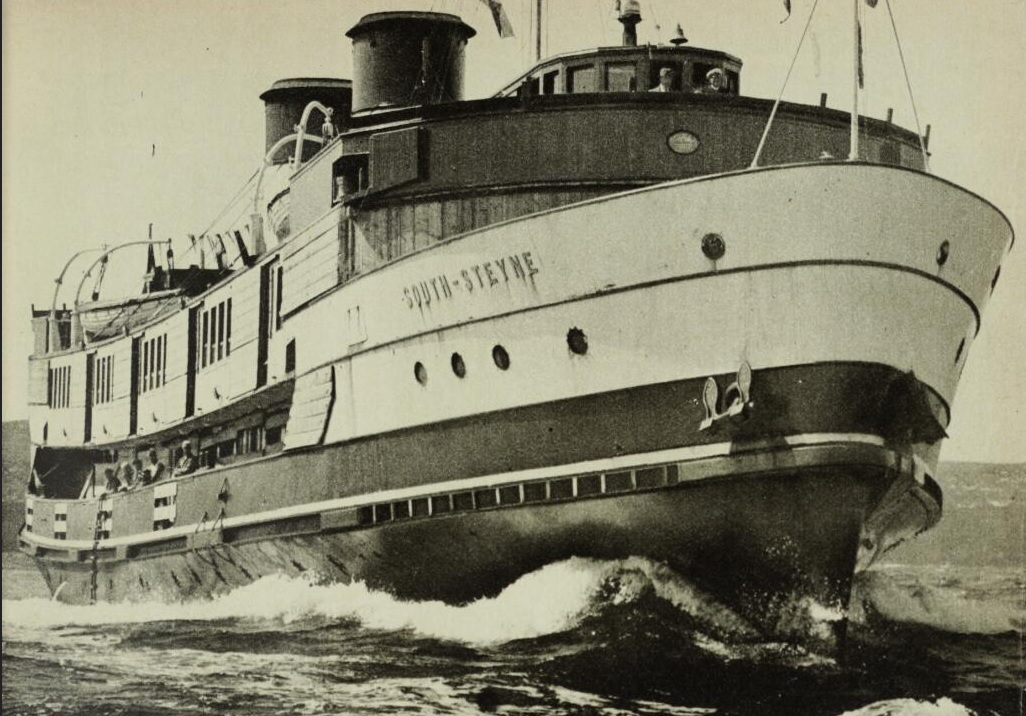
South Steyne arriving in Sydney from Scotland, 9 September 1938, arguably Sydney's most famous ferry.

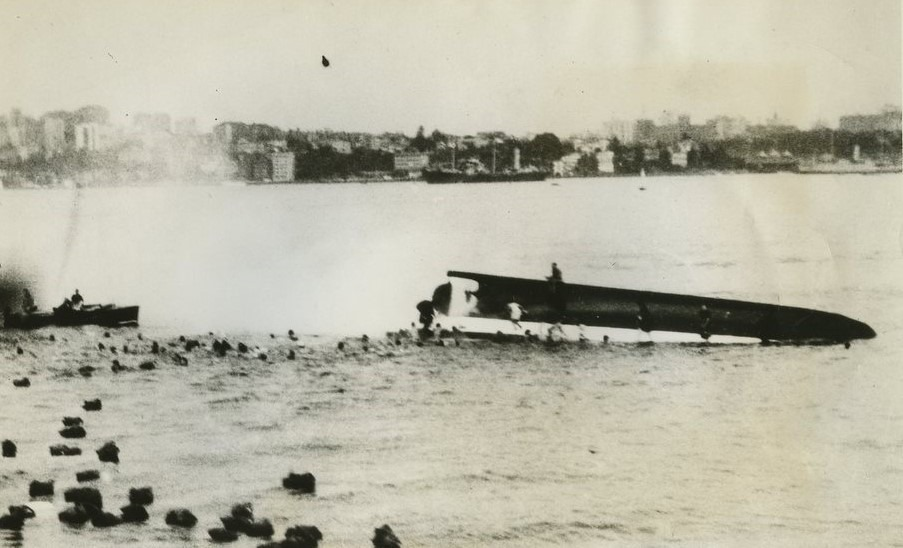
The top-heavily loaded Rodney capsizes and sinks in 1938 with the loss of nineteen lives.

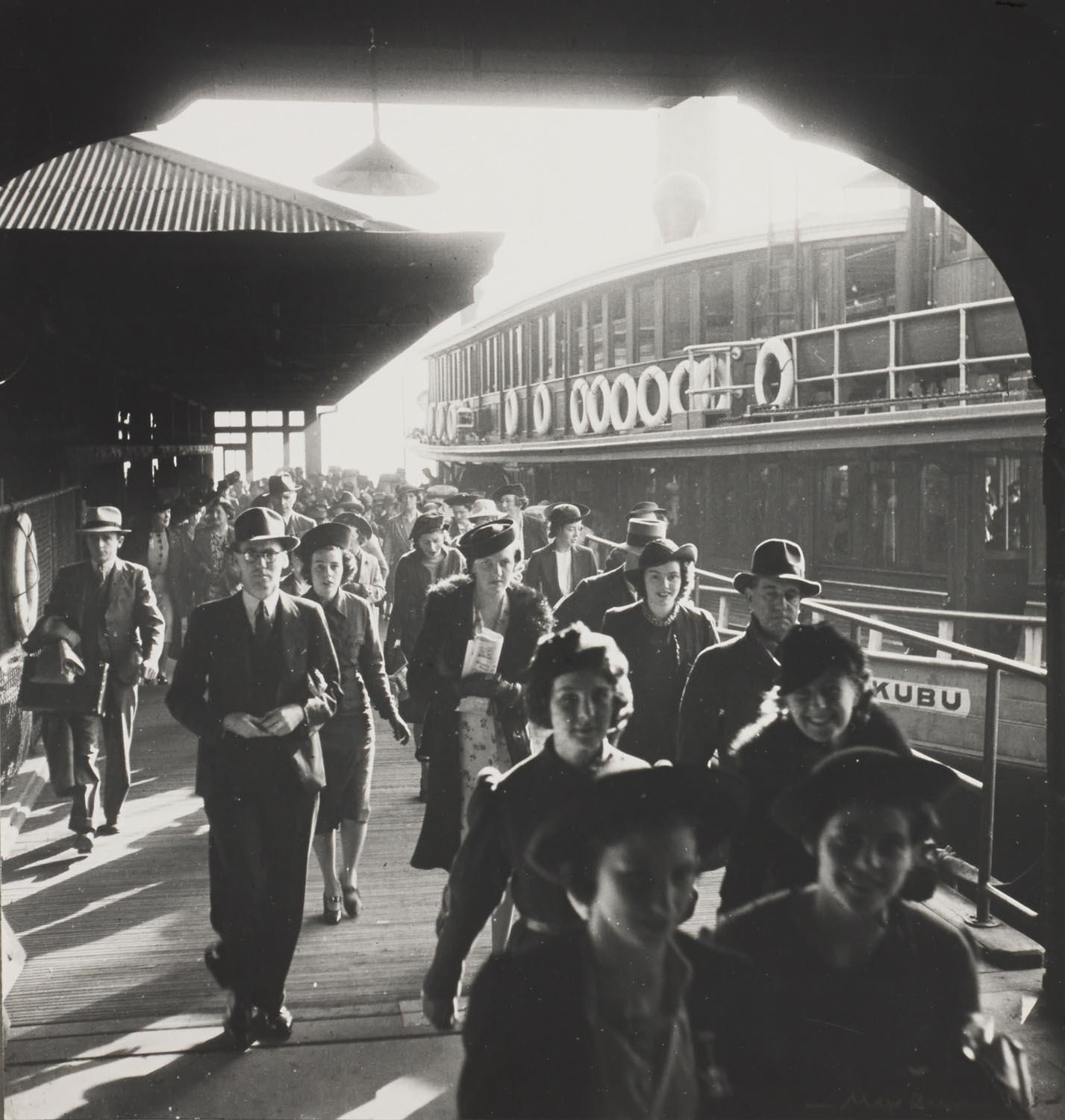
Max Dupain photo of passengers alighting from Kubu at Circular Quay, 1938

== 1940s ==
- 1940s - The post-Bridge fleet rationalisation of the previous decade continues with about a dozen ferries retired. A number are requisitioned by the armed forces and converted for wartime service, including Kuttabul, Koompartoo, Burra-Bra, Kalang, Koondooloo, Kuramia, and Kara Kara.
- 1940s - Manly ferries are painted dark war time colours.
- 31 May/1 June 1942 - During the midget submarine attack in Sydney Harbour, a Japanese torpedo detonates under former ferry, Kuttabul. Requisition by the RAN in 1940, she is in use as an accommodation vessel for Allied naval personnel at Garden Island. The torpedo breaks her in two and she sinks killing 21 sailors asleep on board. The torpedo is thought to have been intended for the USS Chicago.
- 1945 - The difficulties of the Depression and the War effort had propped up post-Bridge demand for ferry services to an extent. However, Sydney Ferries Limited annual patronage falls from 17.2 million in 1945 to 8.9 million in 1951.
- 1946 - Services to Gladesville cease.
- 1946 - Patronage for the Port Jackson and Manly Steamship Company begins to decline after reaching its highest ever annual result (13.5 million passengers). Not being able to afford new vessels, the company plans the conversion of its best vessels to diesel-electric power.
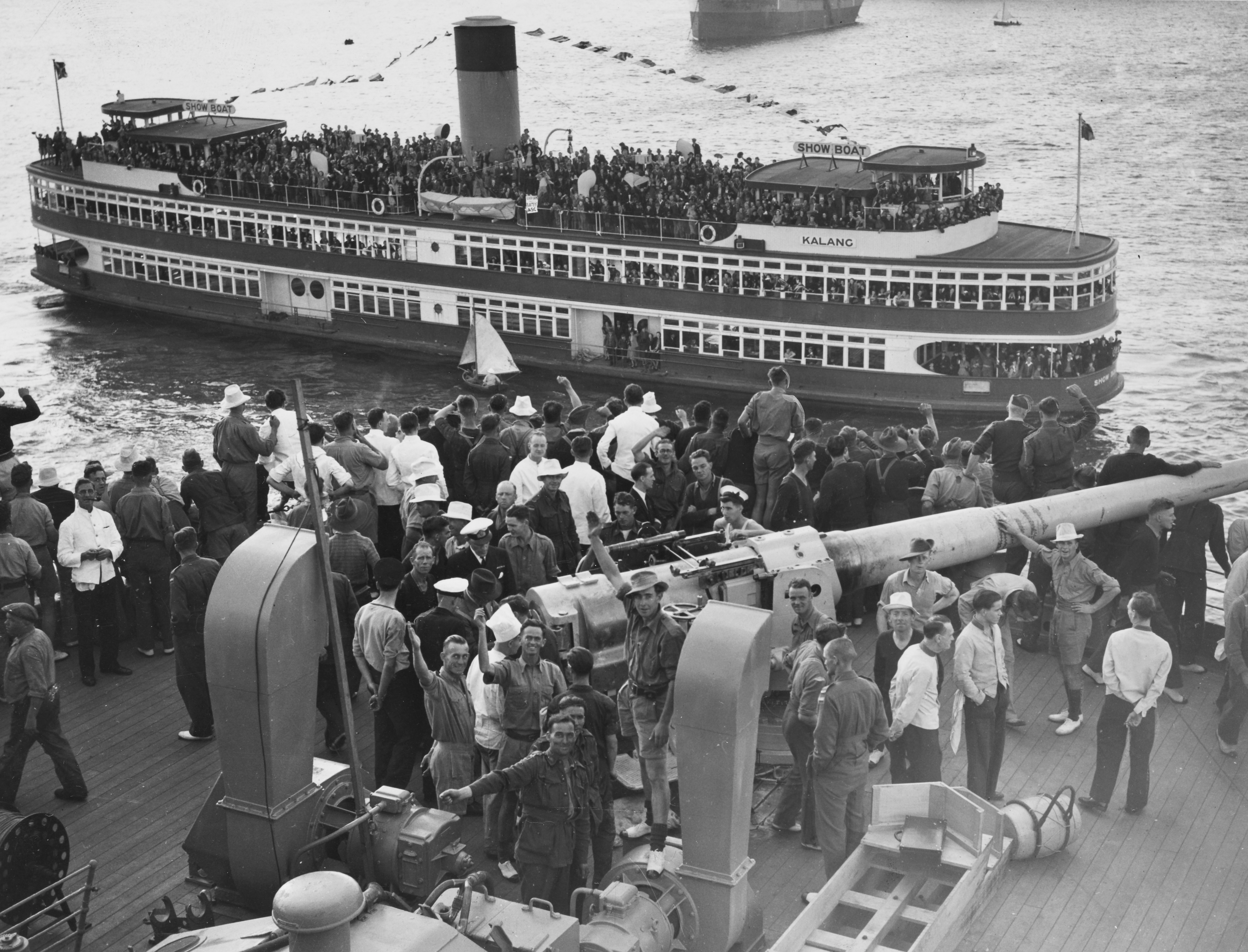
Former vehicular ferry, Kalang, was converted to a showboat following the opening of the Sydney Harbour Bridge.

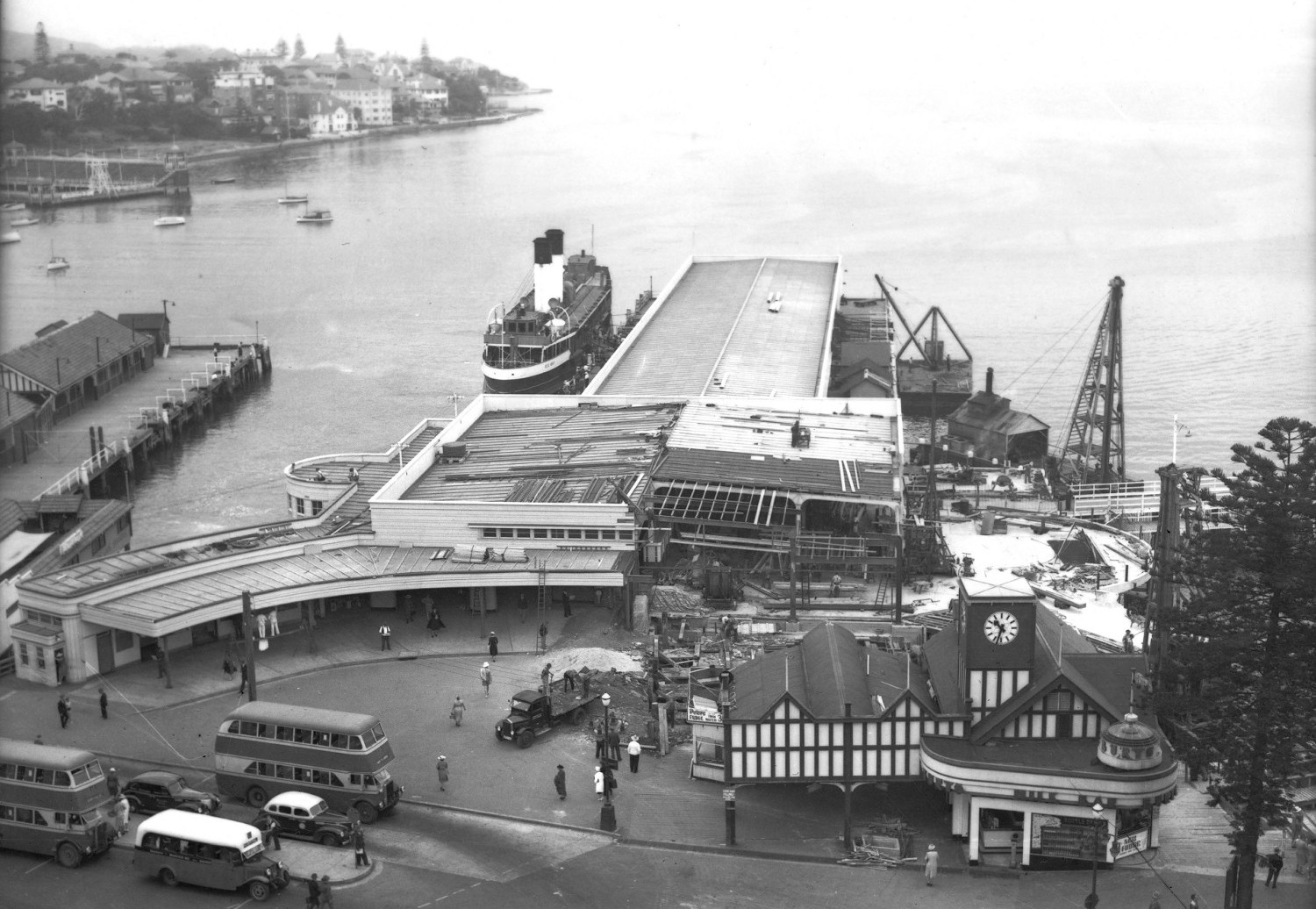
Manly Wharf being rebuilt, 1941, with ferry Dee Why berthed

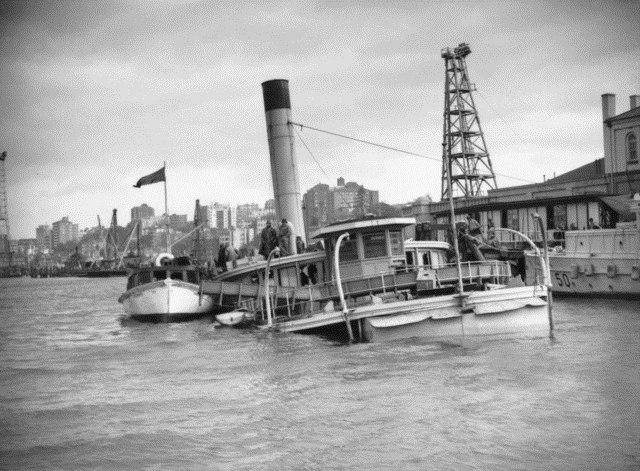
Former ferry, Kuttabul, was sunk during the Japanese midget submarine attack in Sydney Harbour

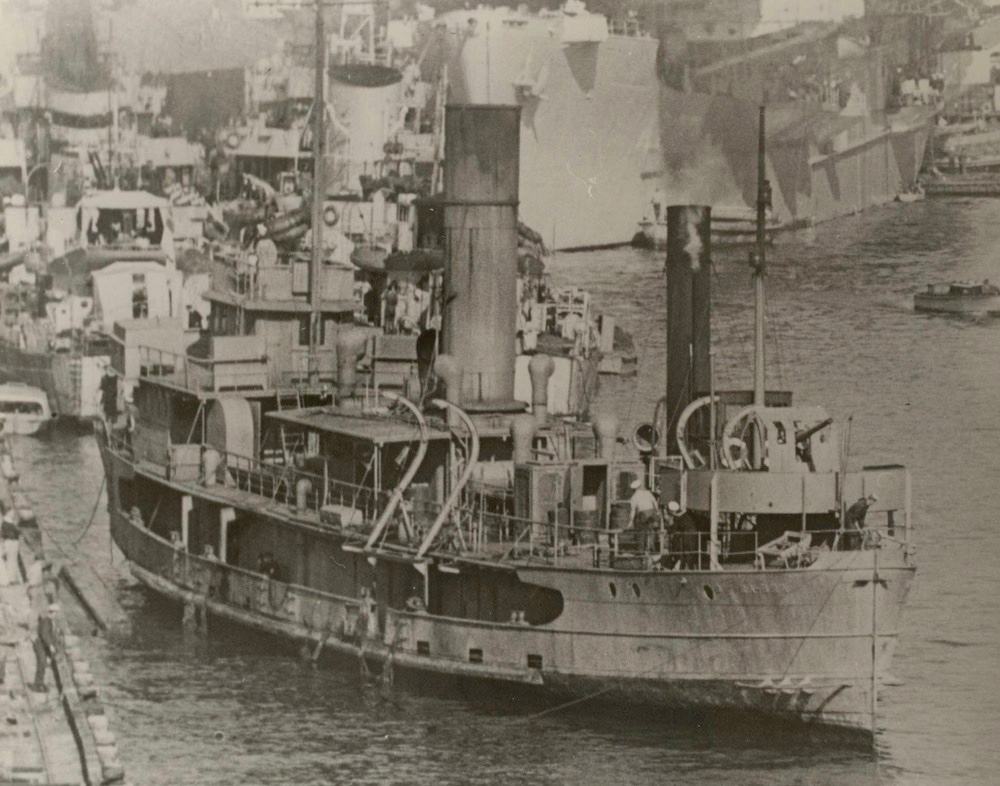
Manly ferry Burra Bra was requisitioned by the Royal Australian Navy in 1942 and converted to an anti-submarine training ship.

== 1950s ==
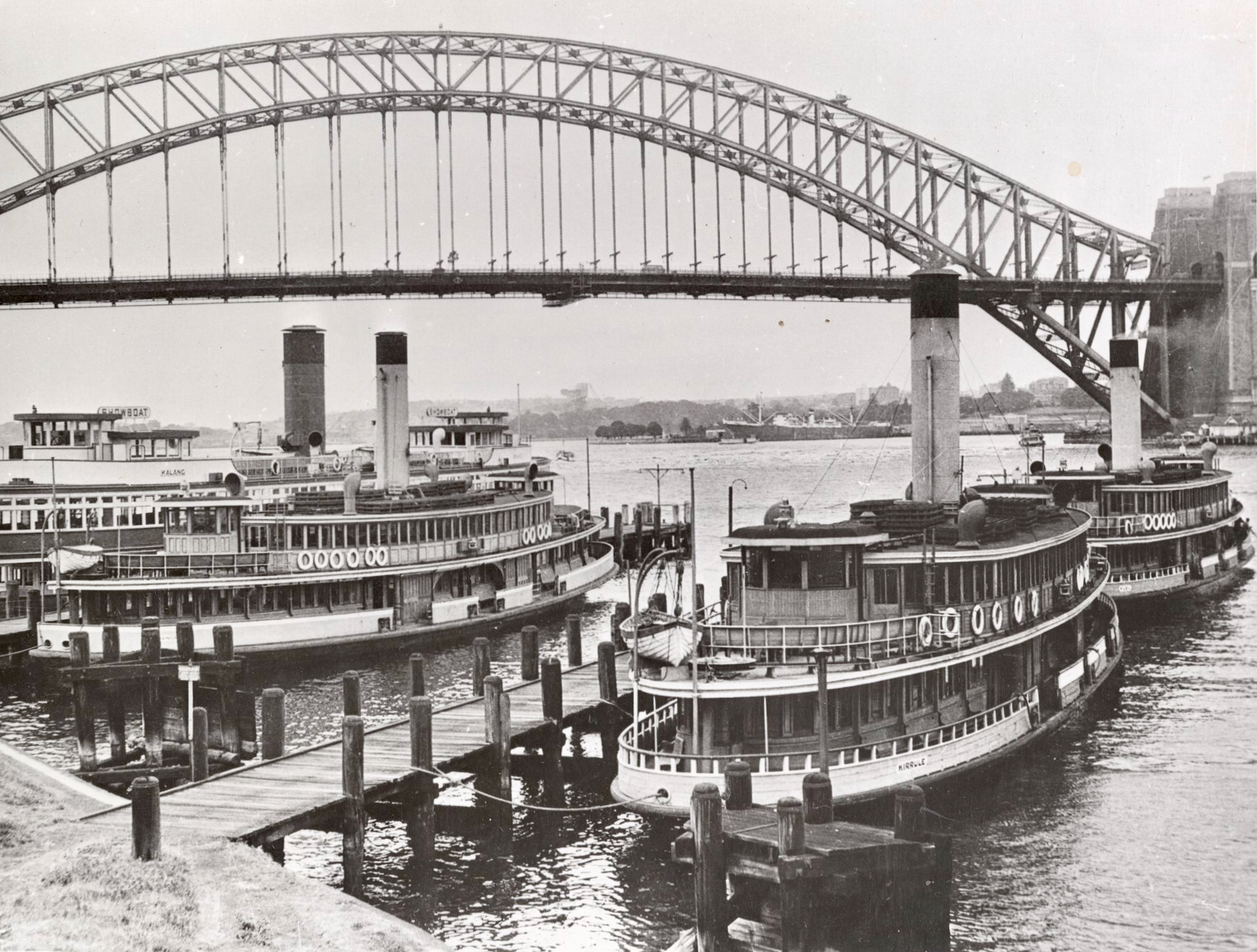
Old ferries laid up at McMahon's Point during the 1950s slump in ferry travel

- 1951 - The New South Wales state government buys the ailing Sydney Ferries Limited for £25,000. Fifteen ferries and the Balmain works are sold to the government with assets taken over by the Sydney Harbour Transport Board. Operations and maintenance contracted to the Port Jackson & Manly Steamship Company. A fleet rationalisation over the next two years sees the large timber K-class ferries Kirrule, Kiandra and Kirawa are laid up. Sydney Ferries Limited is merged with its lighterage subsidiary becoming Harbour Lighterage and Showboat Limited, with the Kalang showboat being its only remaining passenger operation.
- 7 May 1951 - SS Barrenjoey (built 1913), is recommissioned as MV North Head having been rebuilt and converted to diesel-electric propulsion. In the leaner demand of the post-War years, purchase of new Manly vessels is determined to be prohibitively expensive for the Port Jackson & Manly Steamship Company, so it is planned to update Barrenjoey and Balgowlah. However, Barrenjoey's conversion takes 3 years and costing £261,772, which nearly bankrupts the company. Balgowlah is instead scrapped in 1953 and the engines intended for her are put into Baragoola which receives a far more modest upgrade.
- 1954 - The 1913-built Kameruka returns to service following her conversion from steam to diesel power and a rebuild that gives her a more modern appearance.
- 1956 - The Kooleen, a new style of fully enclosed ferry is introduced. Intended to be the first of a series, she is immediately unpopular with passengers (but popular with masters) and no more are built.
- 1958 - Harbour Lighterage and Showboat Limited sells showboat Kalang.
- 1959 - Kanangra returns to service after being converted to diesel, and Kubu, the harbour's last coal-fired steamer is retired.
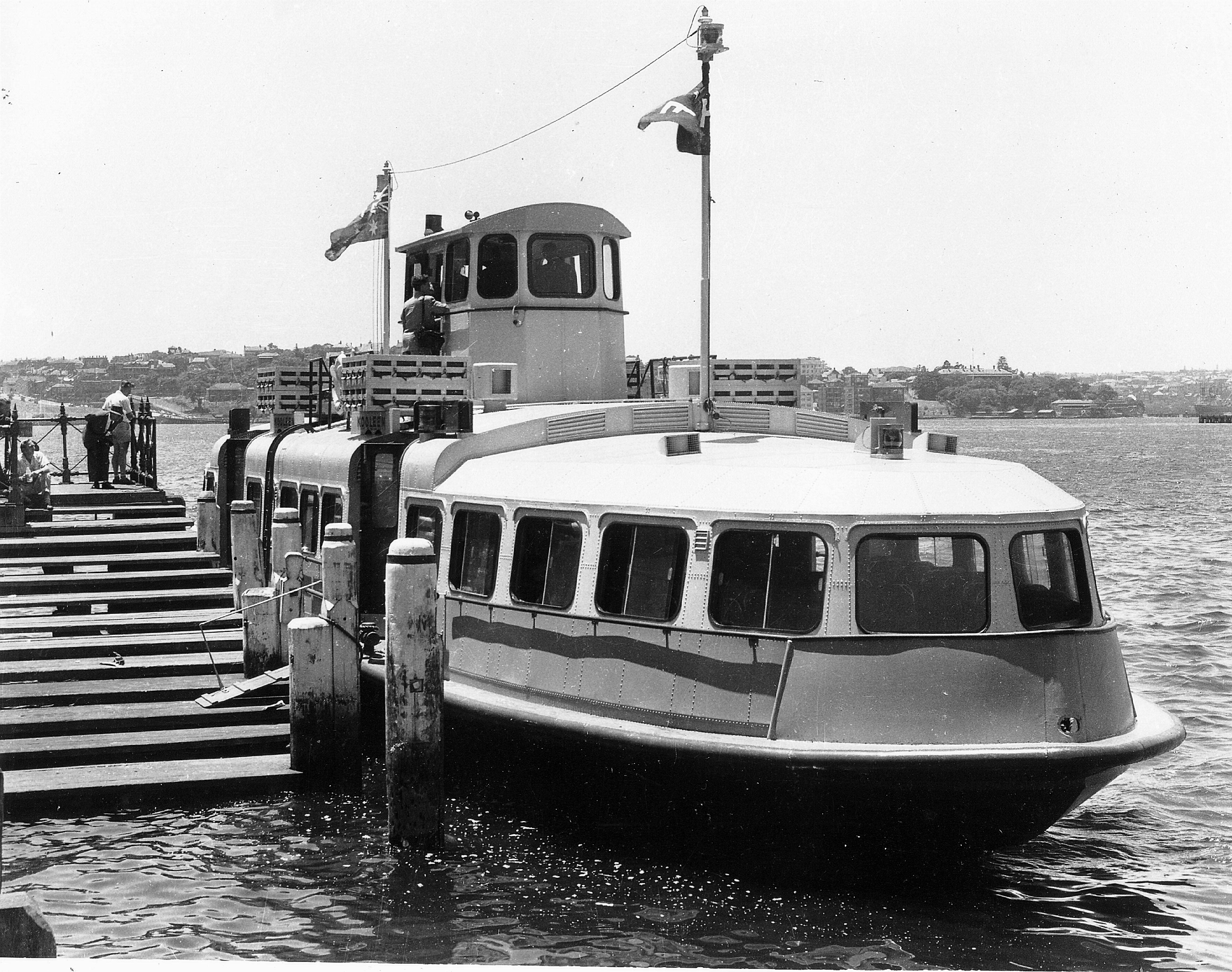
A brand new Kooleen, 1956

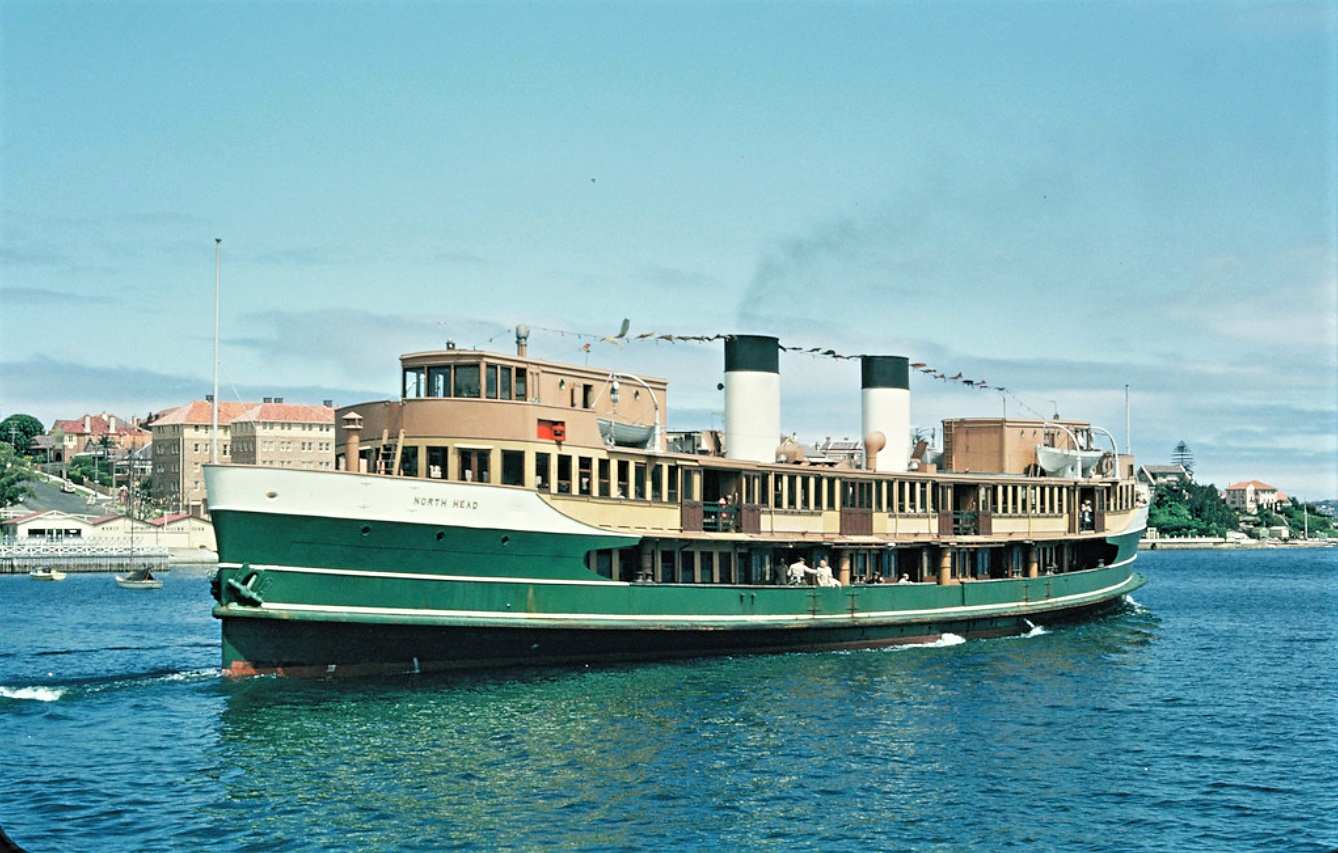
The former steam ferry Barrenjoey (built 1913), leaves Manly Wharf in 1954 following her re-build and 1951 re-commissioning as the diesel-electric MV North Head.

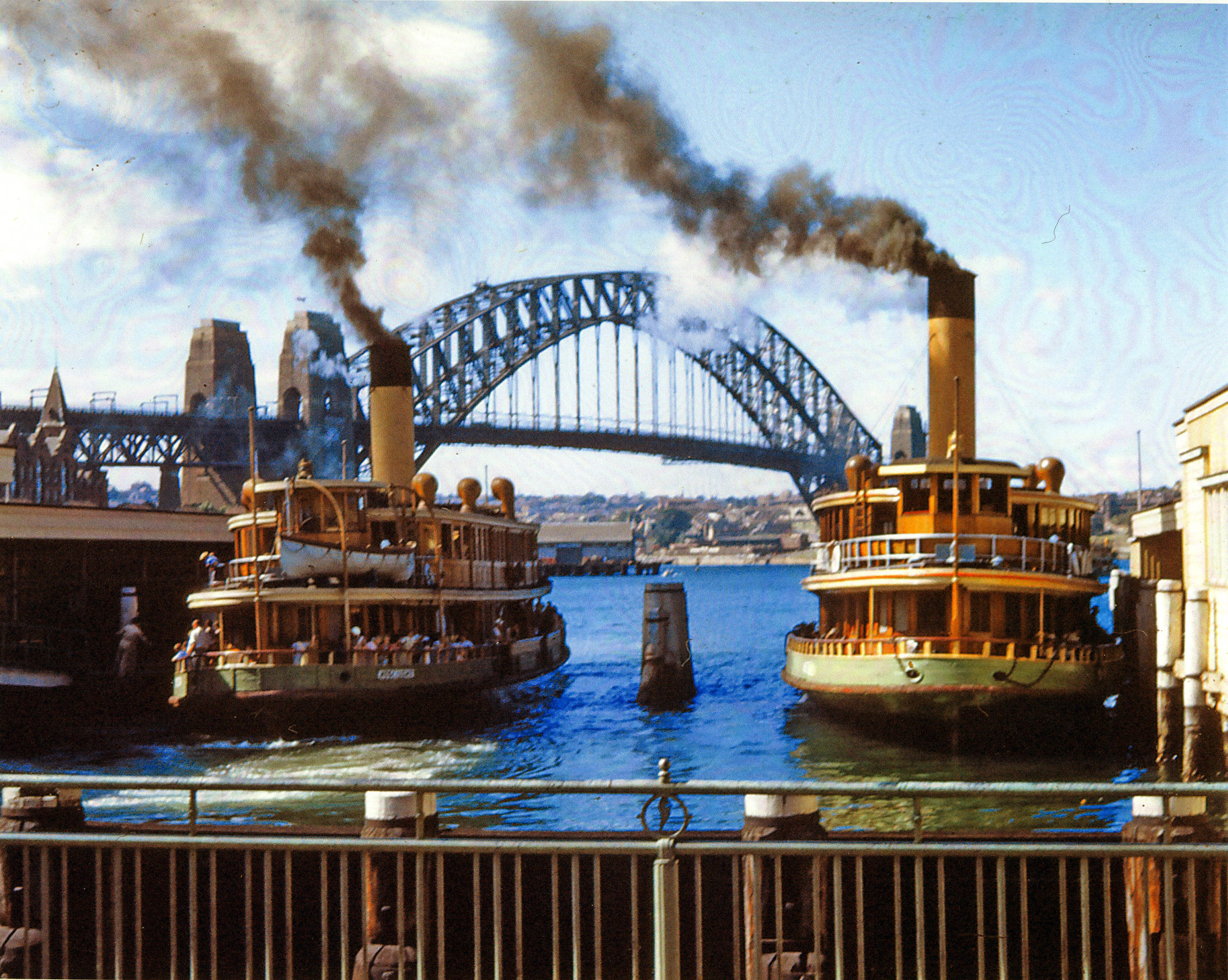
Kosciusko and Kubu, the last coal-fired steamer in Sydney, at Circular Quay, 1956

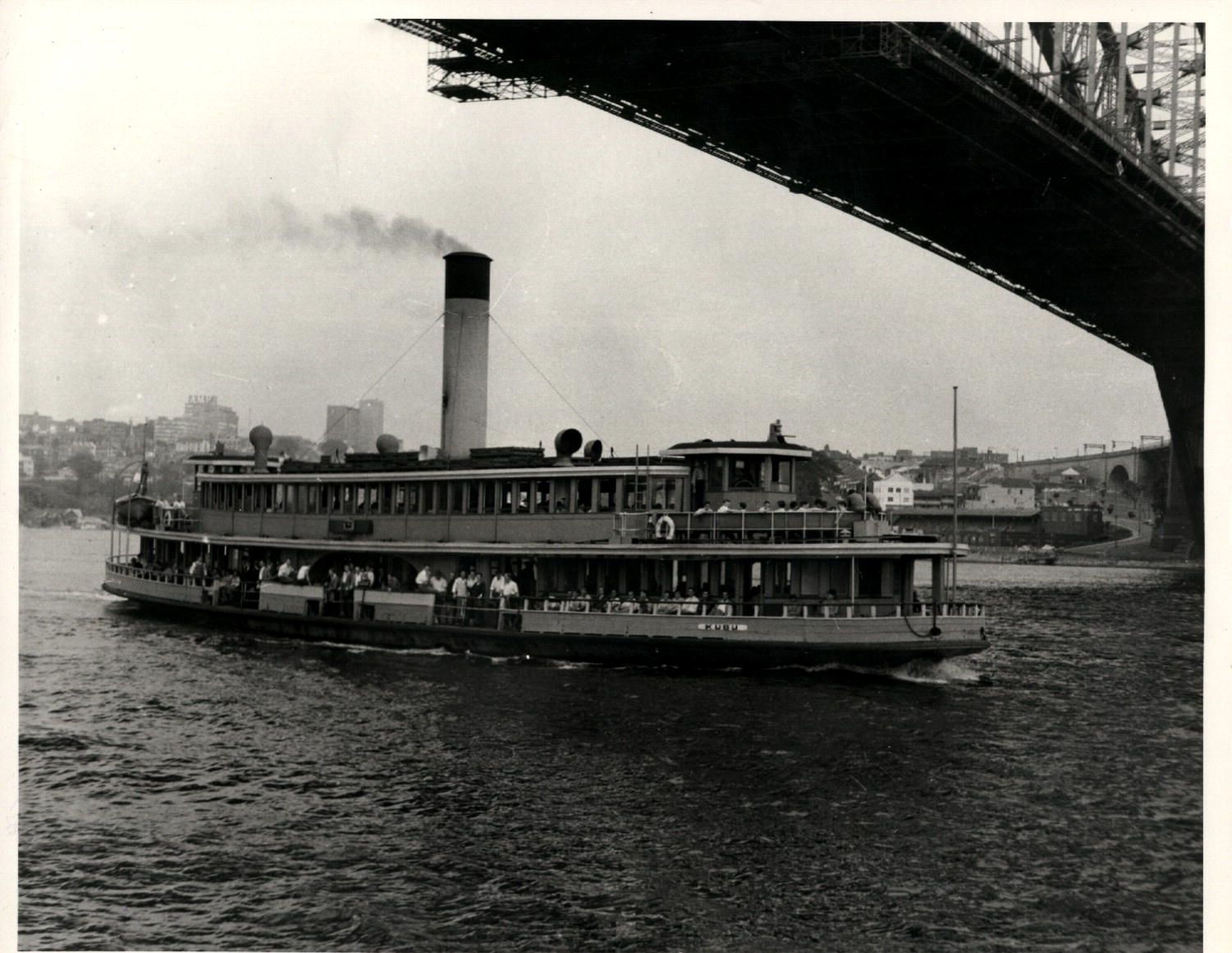
Kubu, the last coal-fired steamer on the harbour, reportedly on her last day of service, 1959

== 1960s ==
- 1960s - With significant harbourside home unit development, the Neutral Bay, Cremorne and Mosman services experience a jump in ferry patronage, the first significant rise in passenger numbers since the 1932 opening of the Sydney Harbour Bridge.
- 1961 - Manly steamer, Curl Curl, is retired after the older Baragoola (1922) returns to service after conversion to diesel power. Curl Curl is scuttled at sea in 1969.
- 1964 - New directorship at the Port Jackson and Manly Steamship Company sees the company investing in offshore oil-rig supply service, the profits of which will be used to invest in a Manly hydrofoil service.
- 7 January 1965 - Manly III, a Japanese-built 75-seat PT20 hydrofoil, enters service for the Port Jackson & Manly Steamship Company. It takes 15 minutes to cover the 10-kilometre (6 mi) journey from Circular Quay to Manly compared to 35 minutes for conventional ferries. Five more hydrofoils will be purchased in the 1960s and 1970s. While they can charge a premium fare for the fast trip, they fail to increase overall patronage, and they take passengers from the older ferries.
- 1966 - The Sydney Harbour Transport Board takes over the remaining Balmain East ferry service from the Nicholson Company and "Lady-class" ferries return to the Balmain service on their way to Hunters Hill.
- 1966 - Karingal and Karrabee are used on a short-lived attempt to run a recreational weekend service to Nielsen Park in Vaucluse.
- November 1966 - A 140-seat Italian-built Rodriguez PT50 hydrofoil enters service. Named Fairlight, it will be joined by Dee Why in 1970, Curl Curl in 1973, Palm Beach in 1975 and Long Reef in 1978.
- 11 July 1968 - Manly steamer, Dee Why, makes her final trip under the command of Captain K Ross. She is sold to Strides shipbreakers in 1969 and gradually stripped. Her hull is scuttled at sea off Long Reef on 25 May 1976.
- 1968 - Lady Cutler, the first of a new series of double-ended ferries is introduced for inner harbour service. The first of the modern "Lady-class" ferries, she will be followed by the similar Lady McKell and Lady Woodward in 1970. Larger versions of the type will follow (Lady Wakehurst in 1974 and Lady Northcott in 1975) and smaller versions in 1979 (Lady Street and Lady Herron). Apart from the unpopular Kooleen, they are the first significant new ferries introduced on the harbour since the early 1920s. Lady Cutler will be decommissioned in 1992.
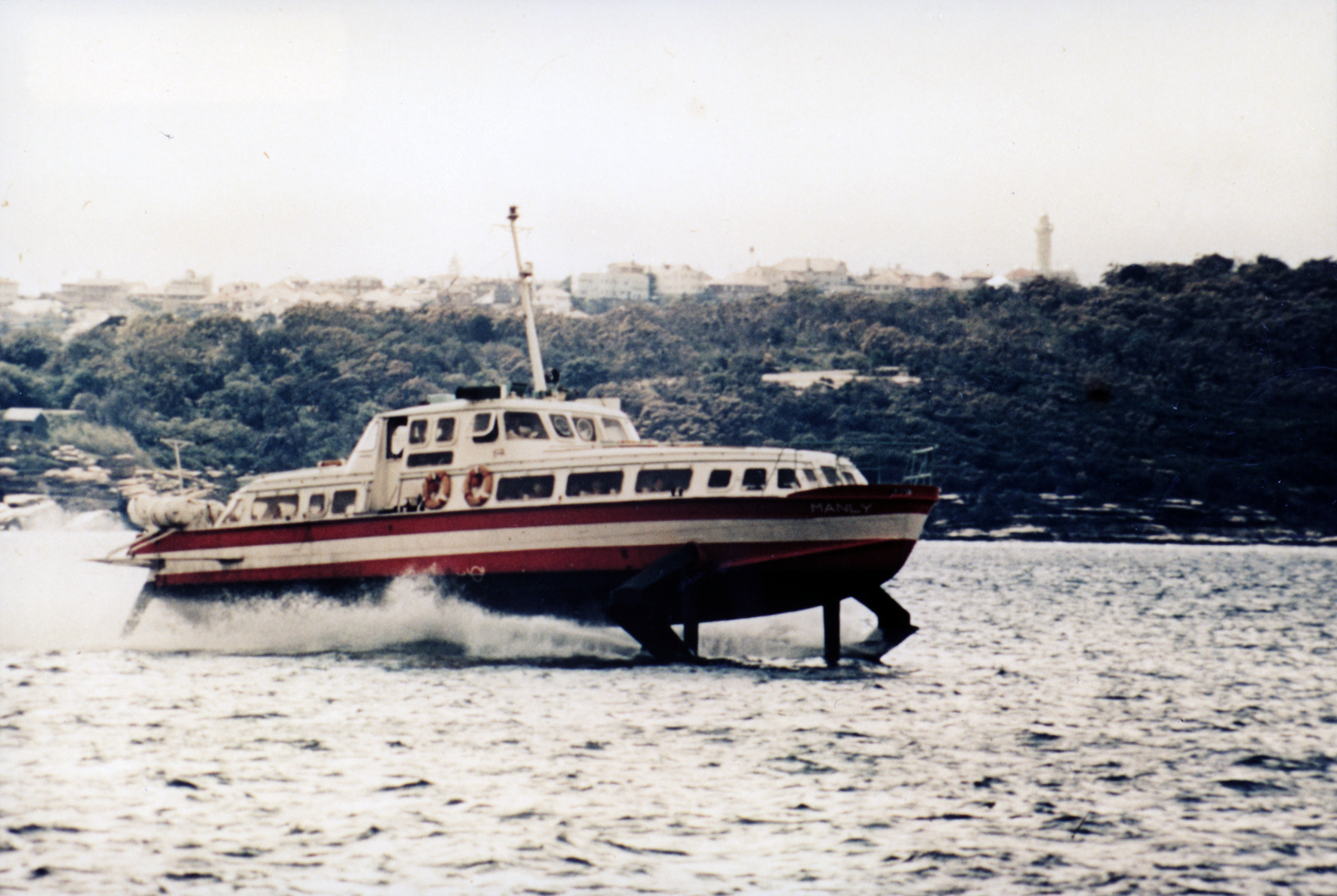
Sydney's first hydrofoil, the 72 seat Manly was introduced on the Manly run in 1965. Travel time to Manly is reduced from 30 minutes to 15 minutes for those willing to pay the higher fare.

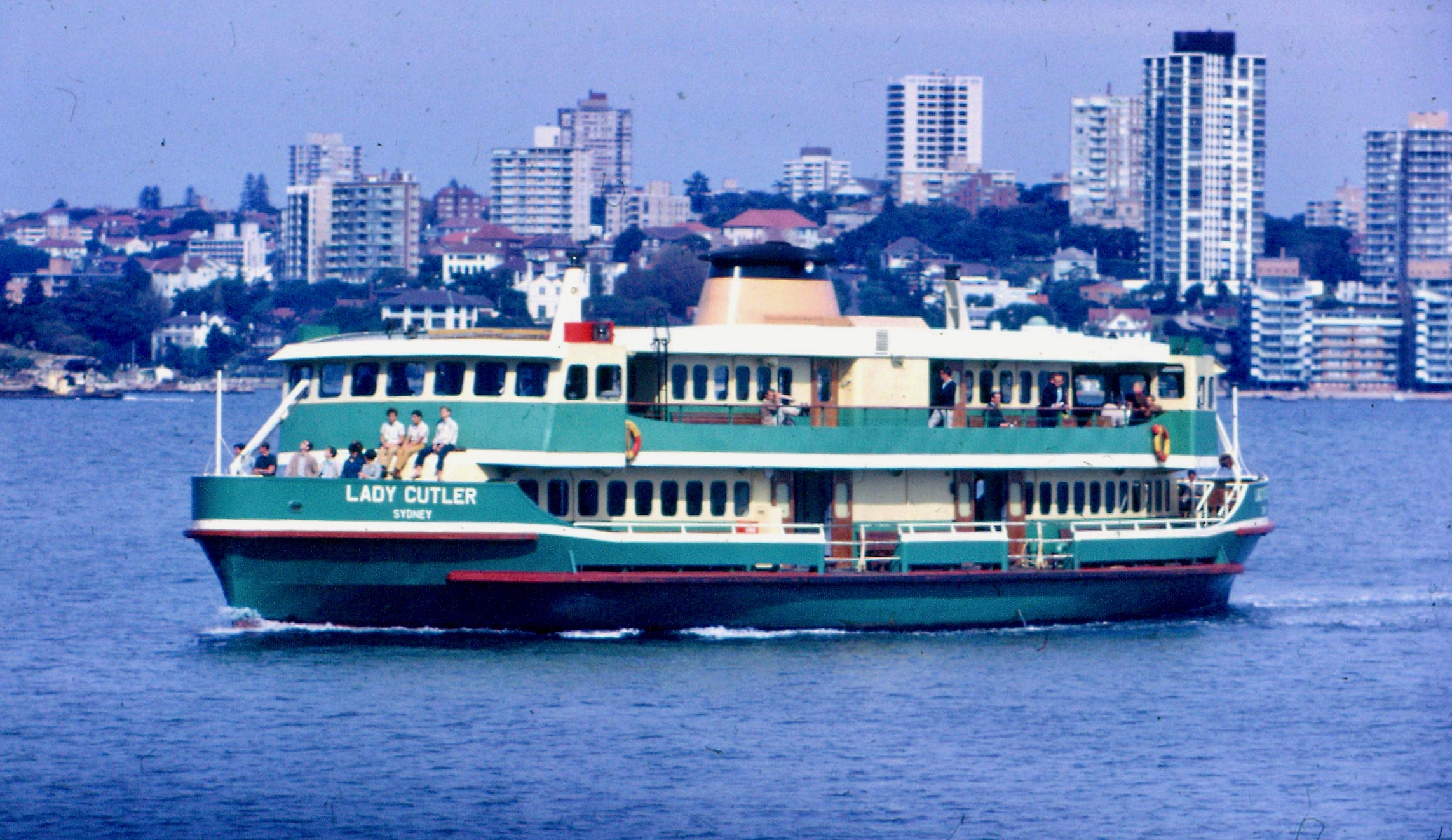
Lady Cutler (1968-1992), in her original livery. She is the first of the new "Lady-class" ferries

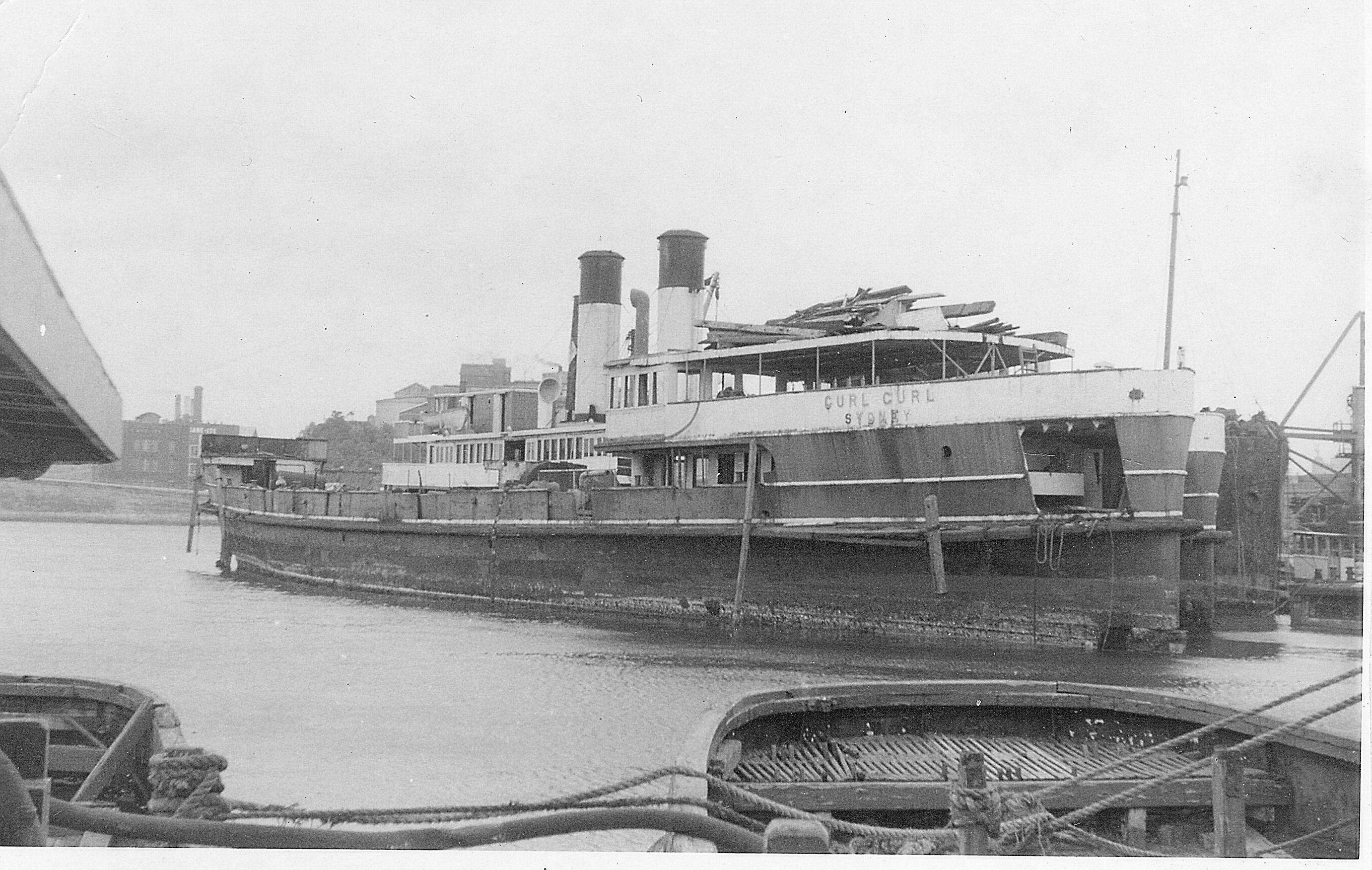
Curl Curl (hulked, front) and Dee Why at Strides shipbreakers, 1969. Once the largest and fastest ferries on the harbour, Curl Curl is scuttled at sea later that year, and Dee Why is scuttled in 1976

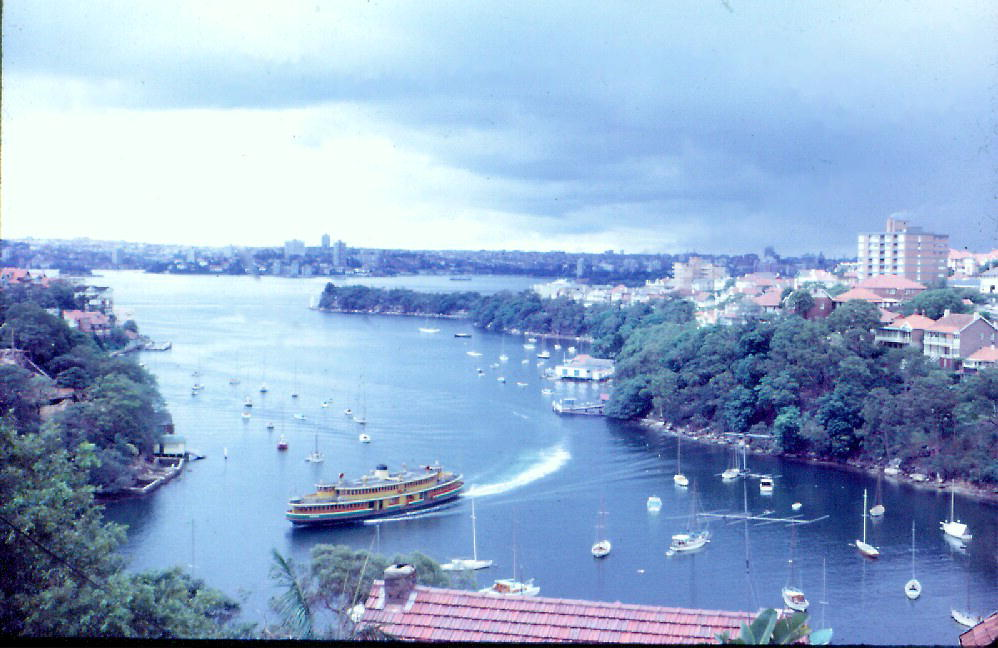
After her 1959 conversion to diesel, the now short-funnelled Kanangra enters Mosman Bay. The Mosman, Cremorne, and Neutral Bay services experience a "mini-boom" in the 1960s due to harbourside home unit development.

== 1970s ==
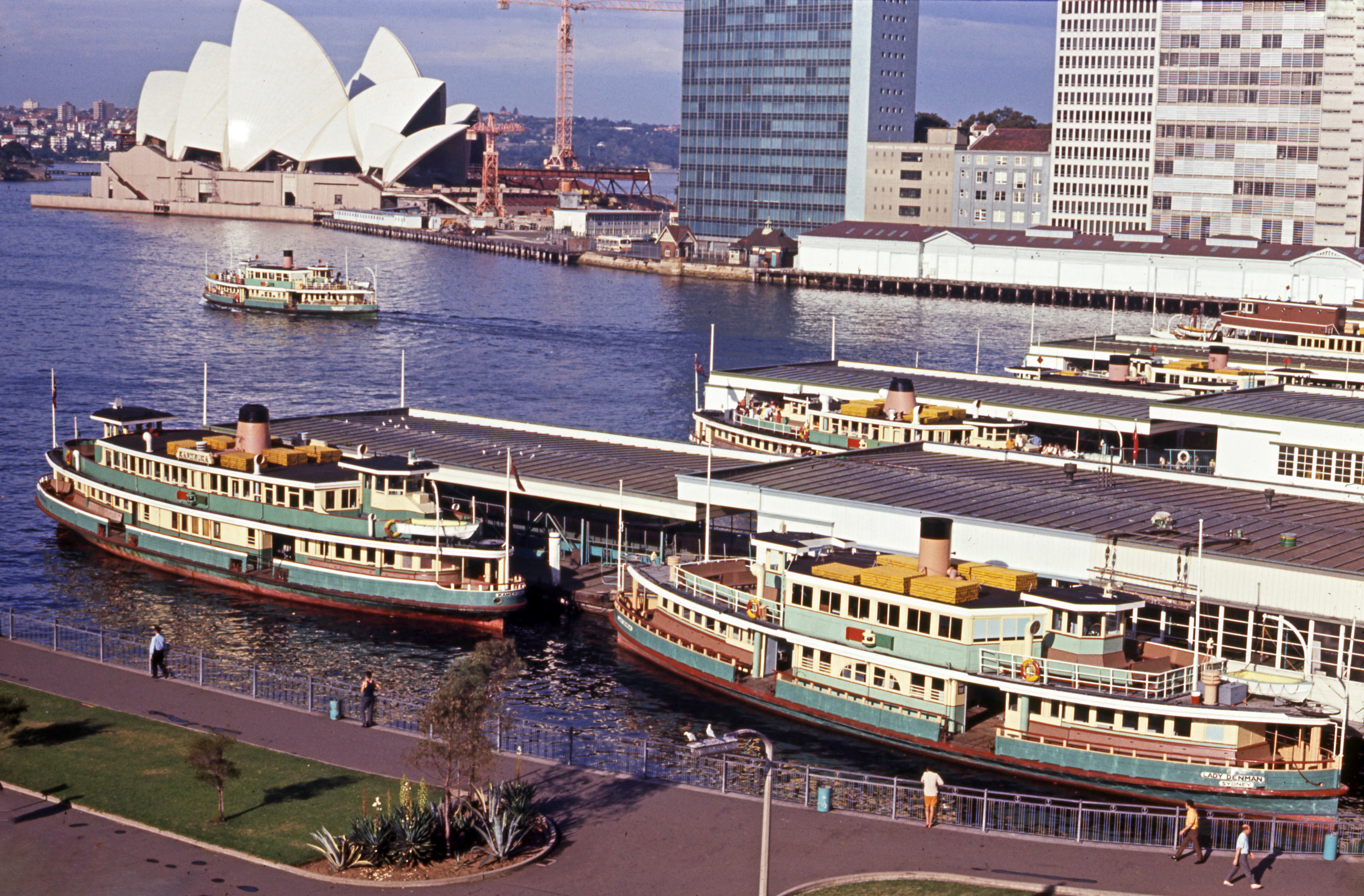
Circular Quay in 1970, when the majority of the fleet were still pre-World War I timber ferries. They were replaced in the 1970s and 80s following government investment in new ferries.

- 1970 - Lady Woodward and Lady Mckell, similar to Lady Cutler, are introduced to the inner harbour service.
- 1971 - With Port Jackson & Manly Steamship Company patronage at an all-time low and a profit of $112,000, Brambles Transport Industries takes over the Manly ferry and hydrofoil services after an offer of $2.1 million was accepted. Included in the take-over are the four remaining and ageing Manly ferries (South Steyne, North Head, Bellubera and Baragoola), and the three hydrofoils. Fare increases and service suspensions follow.
- 1973 - Hydrofoil services to Gladesville commence but are soon stopped.
- 29 November 1973 - The sixty-three year old Bellubera is withdrawn from service. She is scuttled at sea in 1980.
- February 1974 - Brambles announces plans to discontinue the large Manly ferries to much public uproar.
- August 1974 - South Steyne is damaged by fire and pulled out of service.
- December 1974 - the New South Wales state government dissolves the Sydney Harbour Transport Board, and ferries are added to the Public Transport Commission. The Port Jackson & Manly Steamship Company is also taken over by the Public Transport Commission.
- 1974 - Lady Wakehurst, a larger version of the previous "Cutler-type" ferry is introduced. The following year, an identical ferry, Lady Northcott is introduced. Originally intended for inner harbour service, they are modified and used on the Manly run to cover capacity shortages.
- January 1975 - Lady Wakehurst is sent to Hobart to assist following the Tasman Bridge disaster.
- March 1975 - Lady Ferguson and Kosciusko are sent to Hobart to assist following the Tasman Bridge disaster. On arrival, Lady Ferguson is found to be too rotten to be used, while Kosciusko serves for several years in Hobart.
- 1976 - Patronage on the Manly service reaches a low of five million passengers per year down from its 1945 peak of 13.5 million. It will rise to 7.7 million per year in 1982.
- 1979 - A smaller and final pair of "Lady class" ferries, the Lady Street and Lady Herron, are introduced for inner harbour service. Lady Street is in service until 2002 and Lady Herron until 2017.
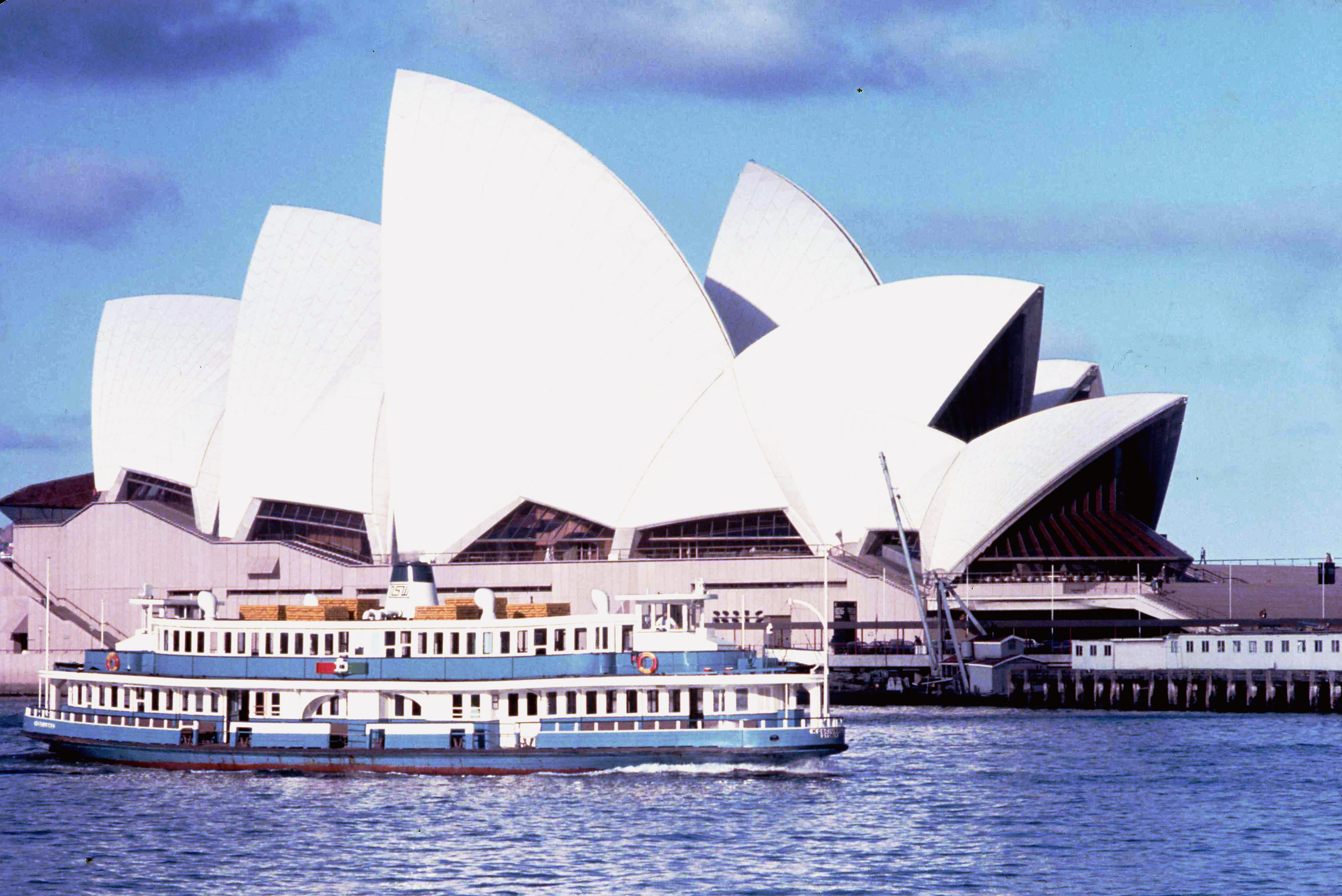
Former steam ferry, Kosciusko (1911-1975) in 1973 as a diesel ferry.

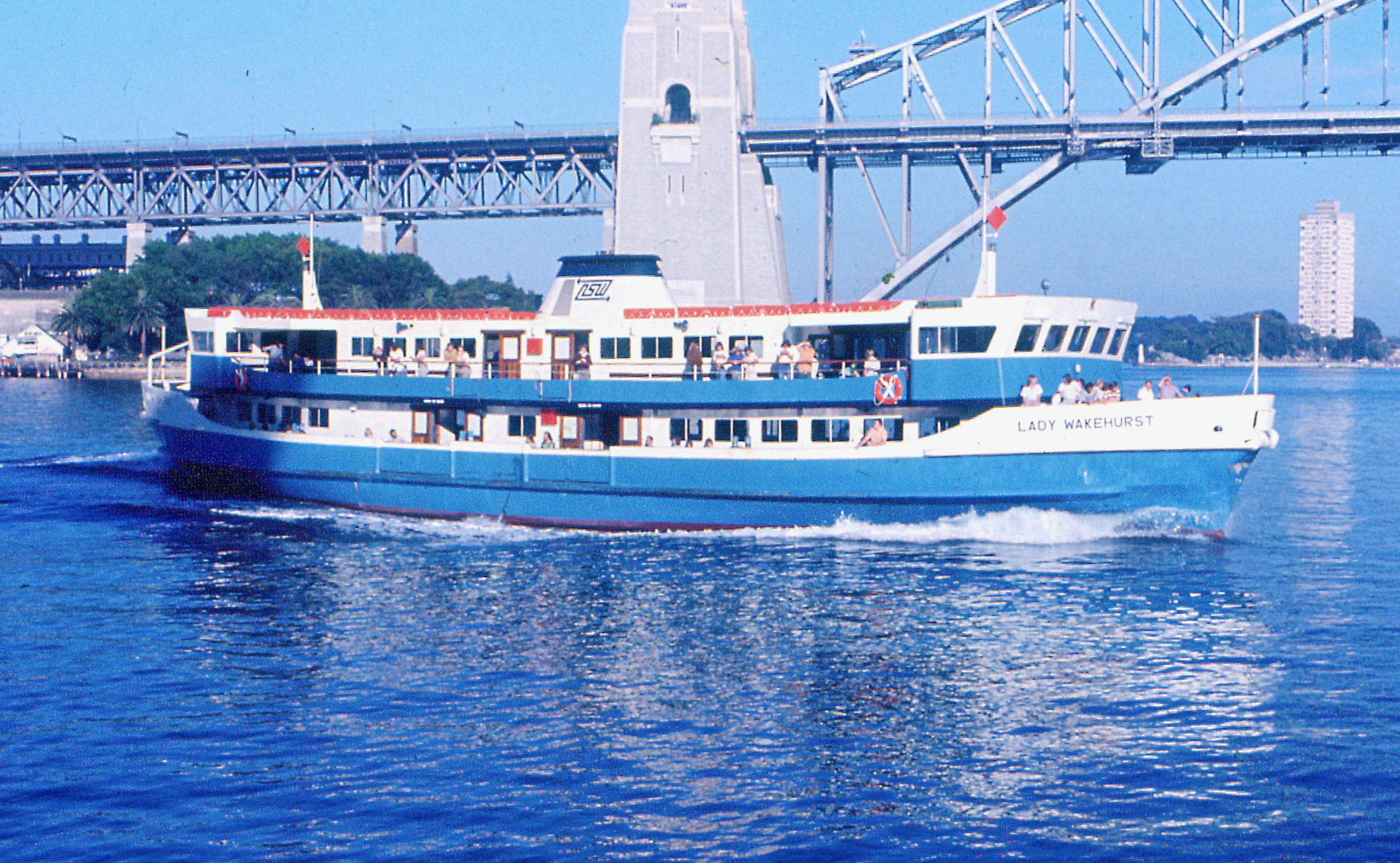
A new Lady Wakehurst (b 1974) leaving Circular Quay.

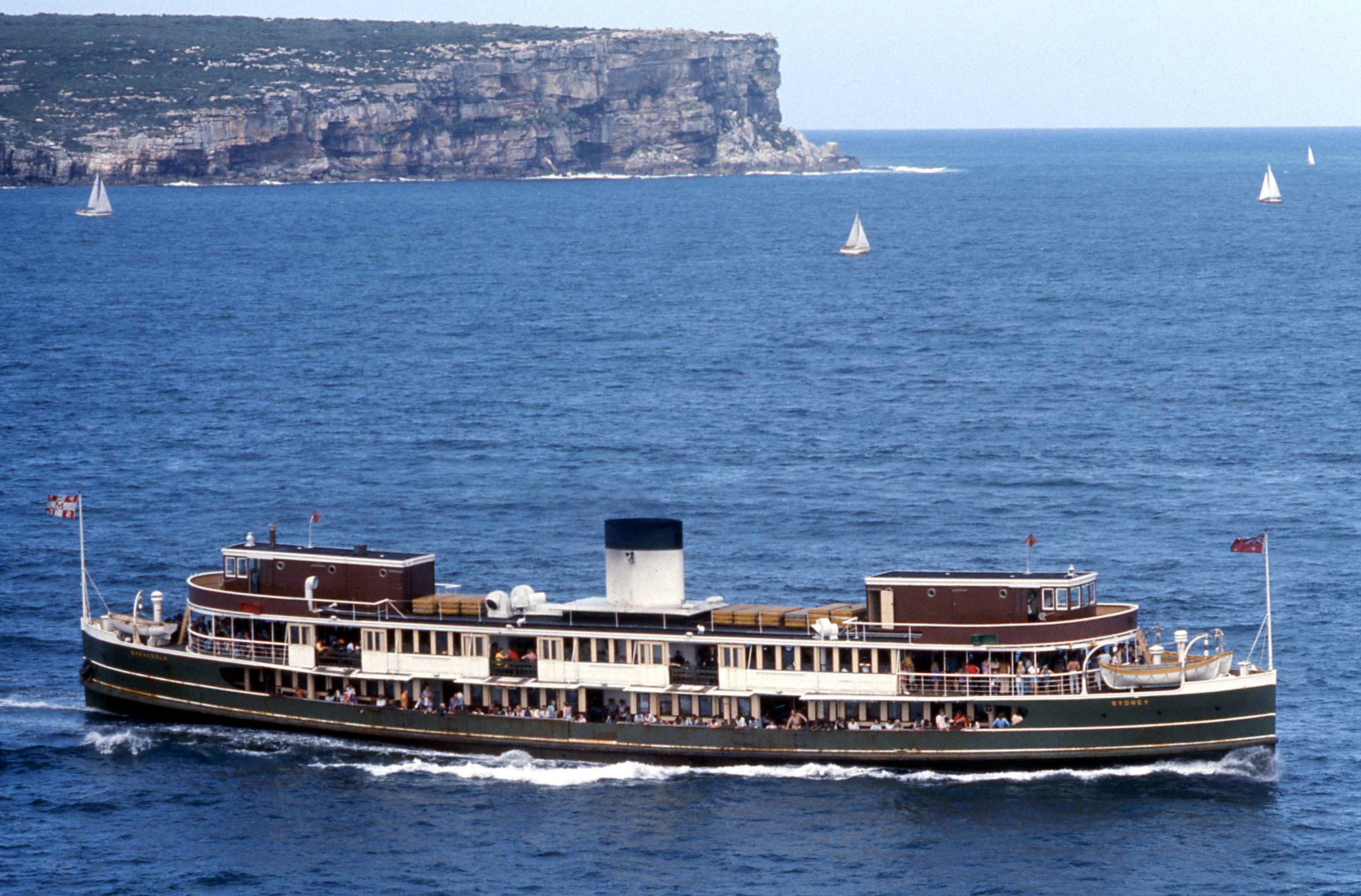
Baragoola (1922-1983) in her old colours crossing the Sydney Heads, 1974.

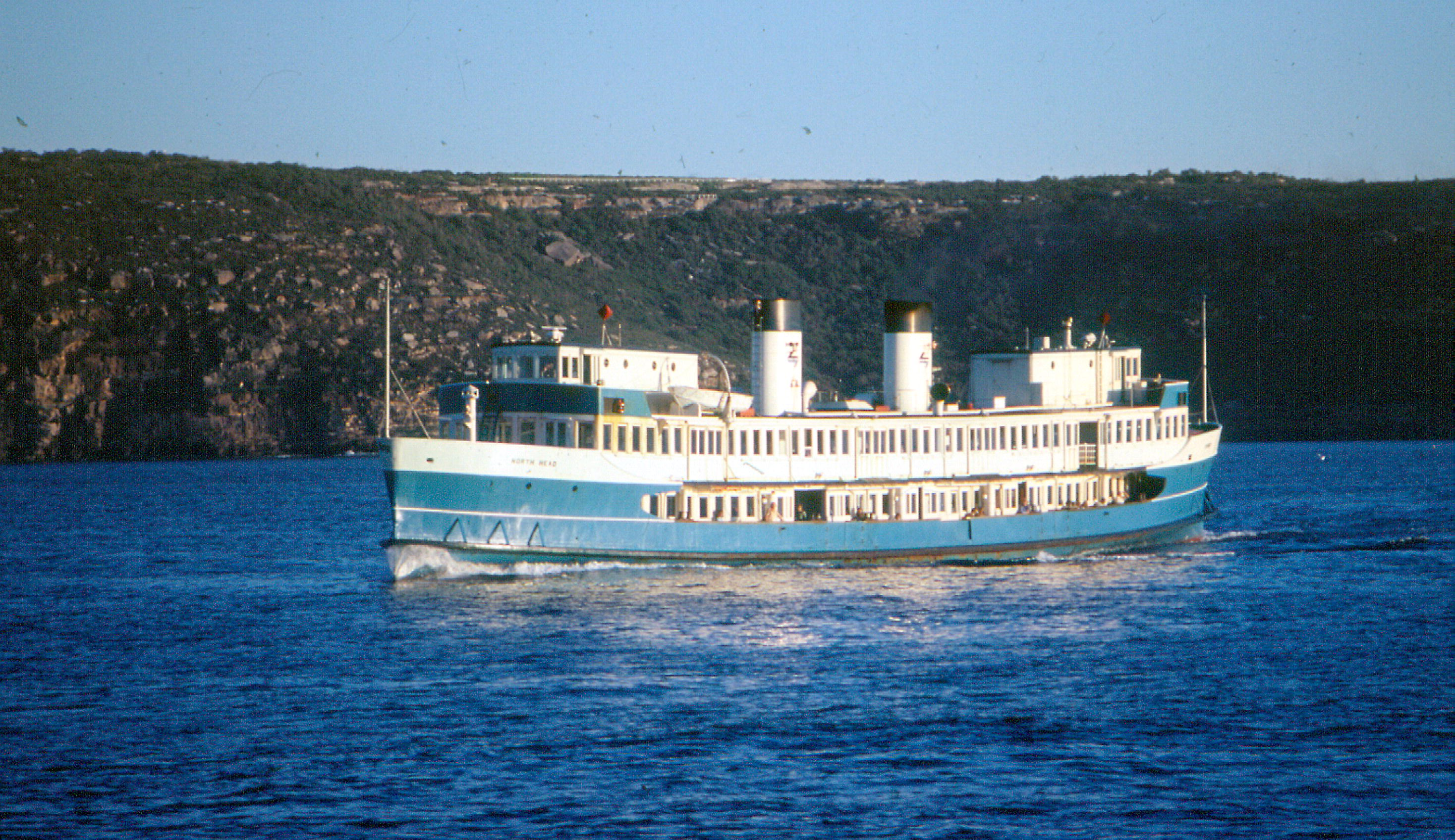
North Head (1913-1985), formerly Barrenjoey, passes Dobroyd Head in her 1970s Public Transport Commission colours.

== 1980s ==
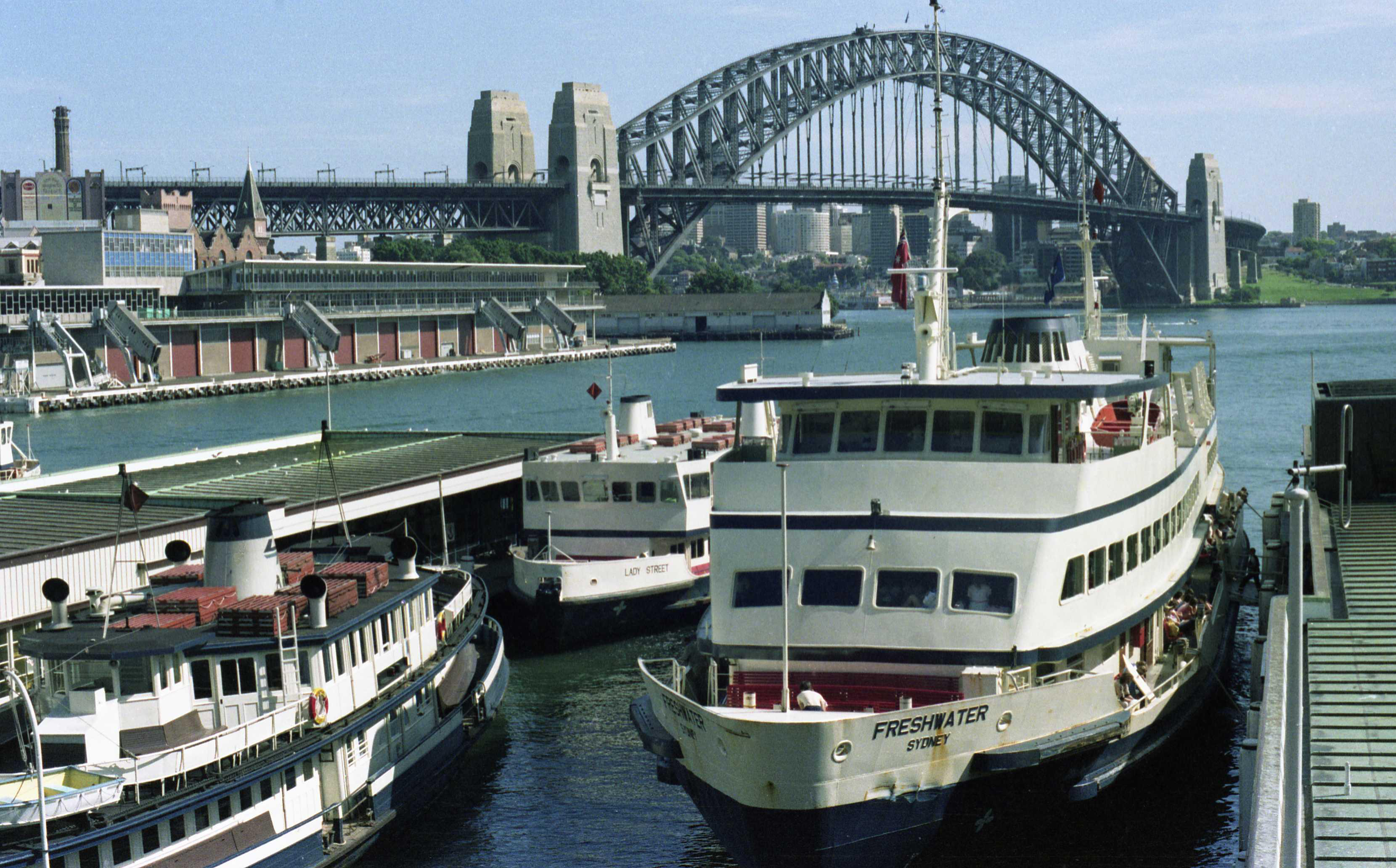
Karingal, Lady Street and Freshwater in Urban Transit Authority colours, Circular Quay, 1983

- 1980 - All government-run ferry operations, both Manly and inner harbour services, are brought into the newly established Urban Transit Authority (UTA) which separates the functions of the Public Transport Commission. Buses and ferries become the responsibility of the UTA, and trains become the responsibility of the State Rail Authority. The ferries' mid-blue and white colour scheme is replaced with a navy blue and white livery.
- 1980 - The inaugural Great Ferry Race is held as part of the Festival of Sydney. Entrants are Lady Wakehurst, Kanangra, Lady Cutler, Karrabee, Karingal and the winner, Lady Woodward. Maritime writer, Graeme Andrews, noted that the event showed Sydney "had finally rediscovered its ferries". In 1981, the race is shortened, better organised and won by Karrabee. The event has been held annually ever since, now on Australia Day.
- December 1982 - The first of the new "Freshwater-class" Manly ferries is introduced at a cost of $8.5 million. With a displacement of 1,140 tons, they are the largest ferries to run on the harbour. The second ferry, Queenscliff, is delivered in 1983, and a third of the original order, Narrabeen, is introduced in 1984. A fourth of the type, Collaroy, is subsequently ordered and is delivered in 1988.
- 8 January 1983 - Manly ferry Baragoola (built 1922) makes her final trip following the December 1982 delivery of the Freshwater.
- 22 January 1984 - Karrabee (built 1913) sinks at Circular Quay after coming third in the Great Ferry Boat Race. All passengers and crew are evacuated moments before she sinks. It is found she has shipped large amounts of water and on-board pumps are blocked with debris left over from recent maintenance. Her sinking leads to the remaining wooden ferries Lady Edeline, Kameruka, and Karrabee's sister, Karingal, being retired from service.
- 1984 - Sirius and Supply, the first "First Fleet-class" catamarans are introduced. Seven more will follow; Alexander (1985), Borrowdale (1985), Charlotte (1985), Fishburn (1985), Friendship (1986), Golden Grove (1986) and Scarborough (1986). The nine 400-seat ferries remain the backbone of the current fleet and full upgrades to each ferry in 2020 will extend their lives for another 10 years.
- 1984/85 - Two 235-seat hydrofoils, Manly (IV) and Sydney, enter service.
- 1985 - North Head, the longest serving Manly ferry (built as Barrenjoey in 1913), is taken out of service.
- 1989 - The UTA is replaced in January by the State Transit Authority.
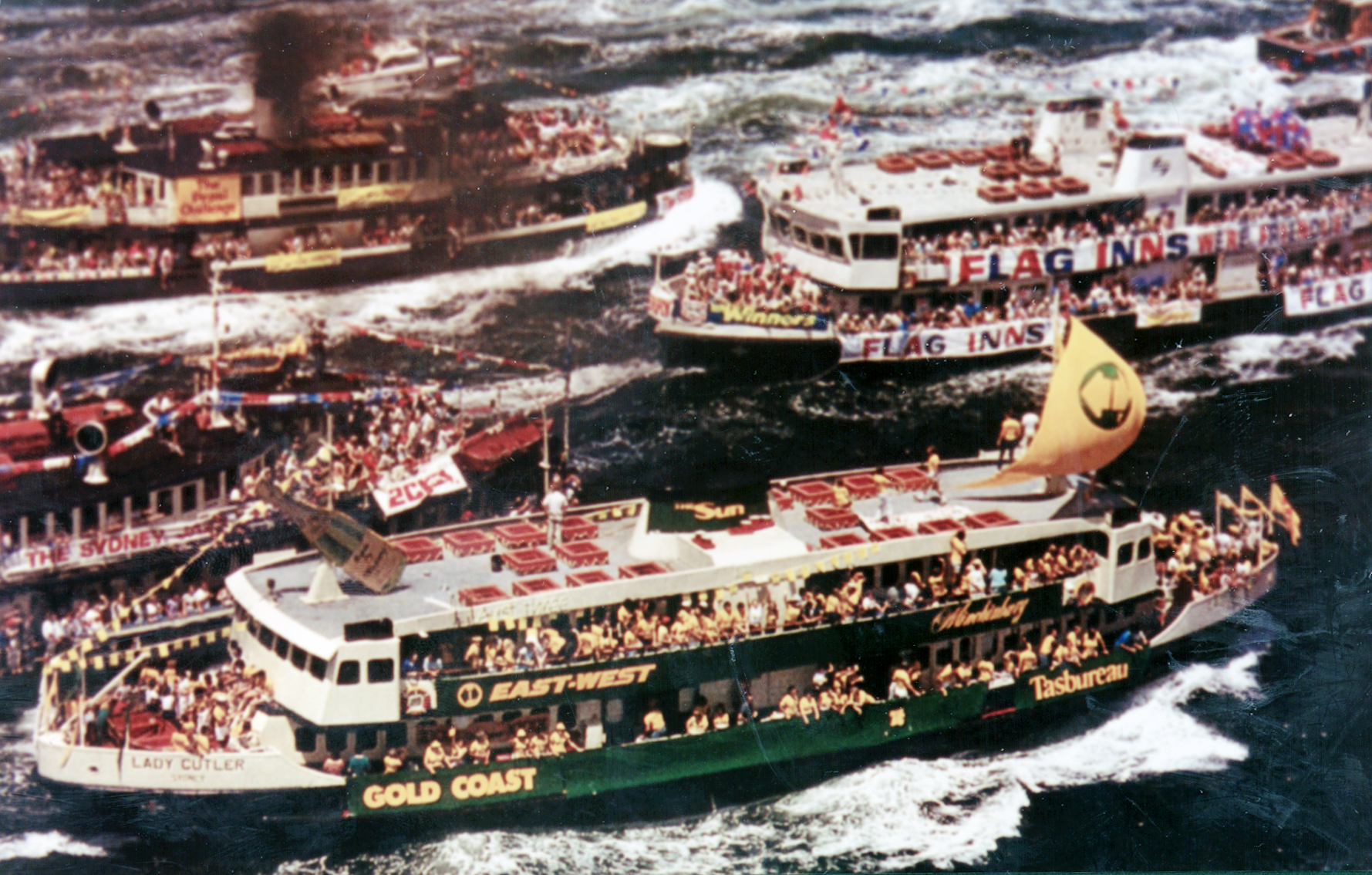
Ferries in the inaugural Great Ferry Boat Race, 1980

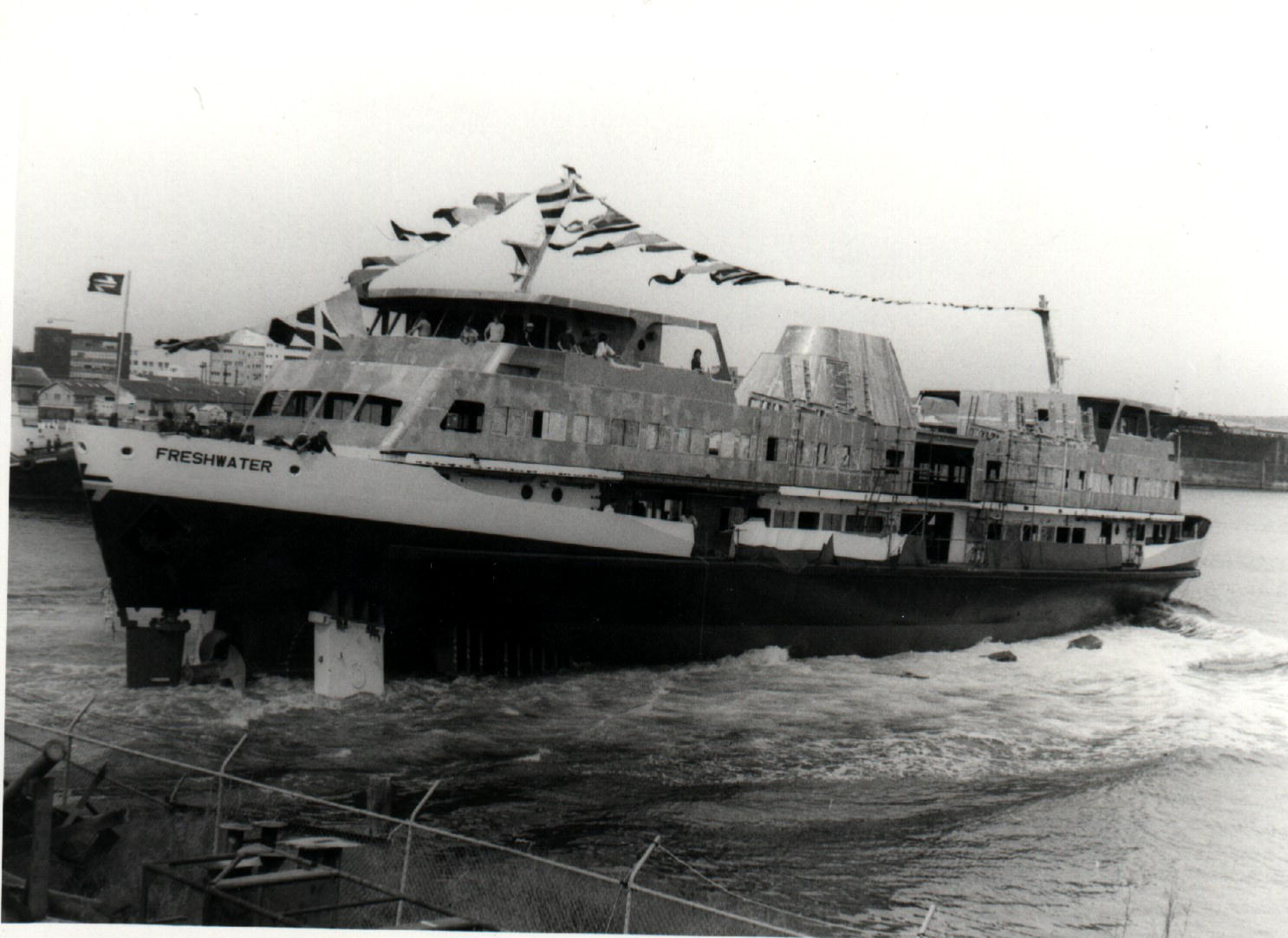
Freshwater launching at Newcastle, 1982, the first of a new class of four Manly ferries.

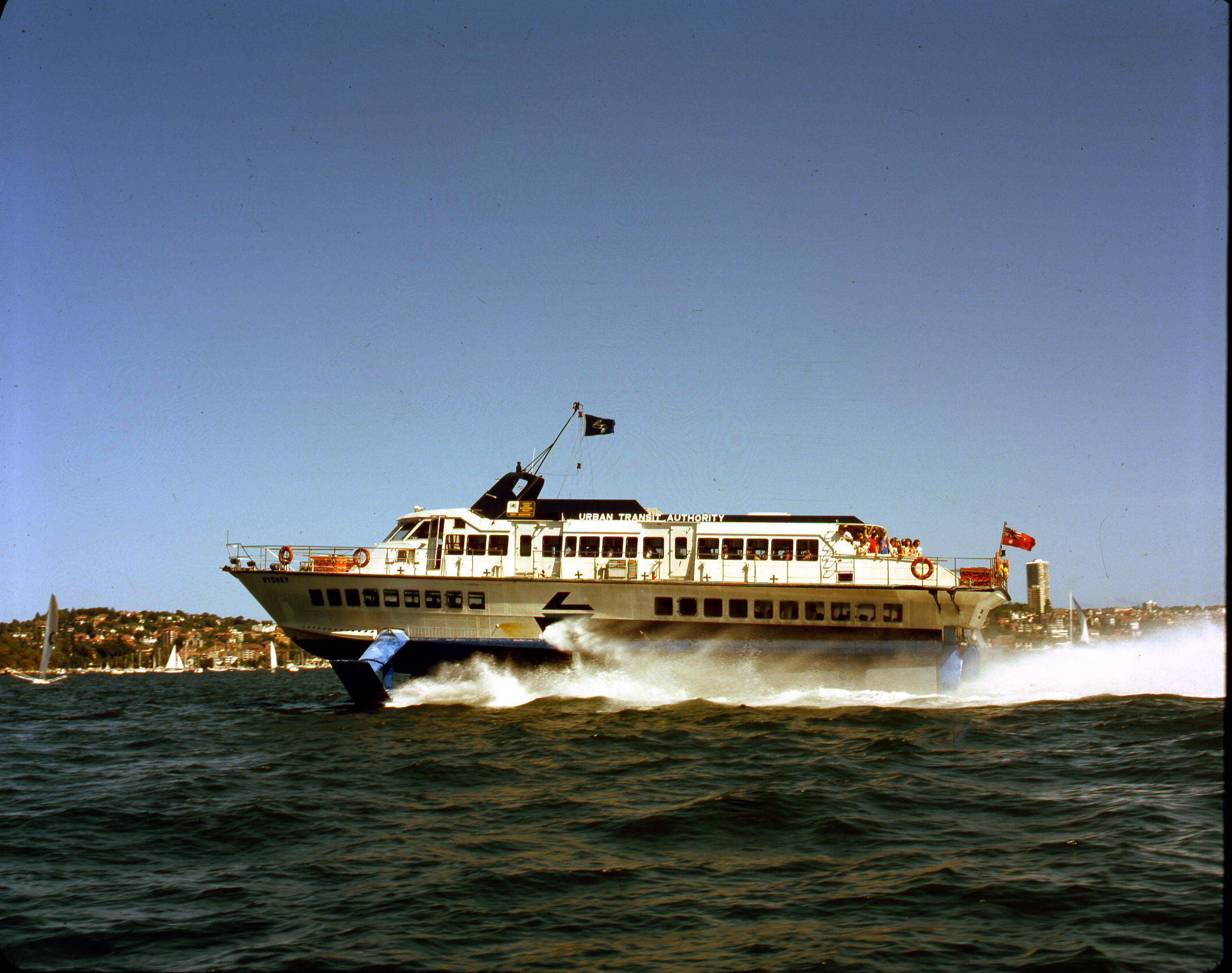
235-seat hydrofoil, Sydney (1985) on its way to Manly.

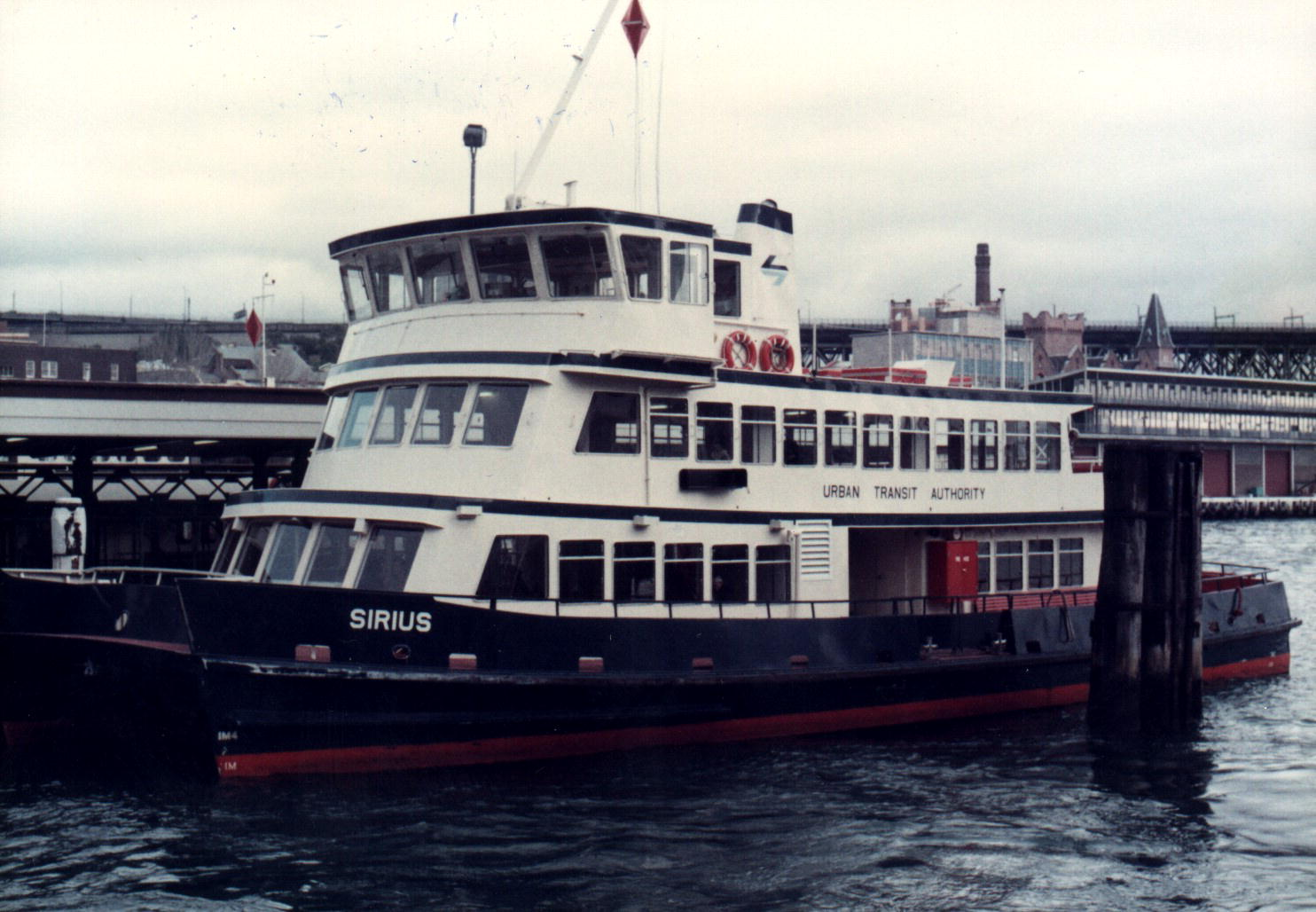
Sirius (1984), the first of nine "First Fleet-class" ferries in her original blue and white livery

== 1990s and 2000s ==
- 1991 - The remaining hydrofoils are replaced with three JetCats that serve until their replacement with the Manly Fast Ferry in 2009.

1991 - Lady Cutler decommissioned

- 1992 - The first of six "RiverCat"-class ferries are delivered to replace First Fleet class ferries on the Circular Quay to Meadowbank service and allowing services to Parramatta wharf.
- August 1995 - The 7th and final RiverCat Nicole Stevenson enters service
- 15 September 2000 - Manly ferry Collaroy carries the Olympic torch across Sydney Harbour.
- 2000/01 - Four SuperCats enter service. They primarily operated on Eastern Suburbs services and are on occasion used on the Manly run.
- February 2001 - Collaroy runs aground on Manly Point, putting the ferry out of service for several months and costing $2 million to repair.
- October 2002 - Lady-class ferry Lady Street is retired from service.
- 2004 - Ferries are separated from the State Transit Authority into a separate agency, Sydney Ferries Corporation.
- November 2007 - Bret Walker delivers his report on his government-ordered commission of inquiry into Sydney Ferries' operations. The report is critical of the Ferries management, industrial relations and government's involvement. The report's recommendations include the replacement of the entire ageing fleet and handing day-to-day operations over to a private sector operator whilst the NSW government retained the fleet and other assets, in public ownership.
- 31 December 2008 - All three JetCats were retired from service
- 10 February 2009 - Following a State Government request for commercial tenders to replace the JetCat service, Bass & Flinders Cruises, trading as Manly Fast Ferry, commences an interim Circular Quay to Manly fast ferry service.
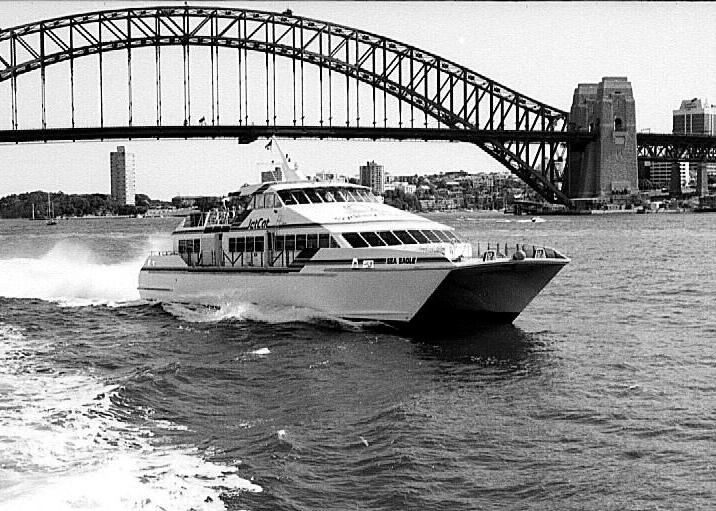
JetCat Sea Eagle (1991-2008) on its way to Manly, 1991

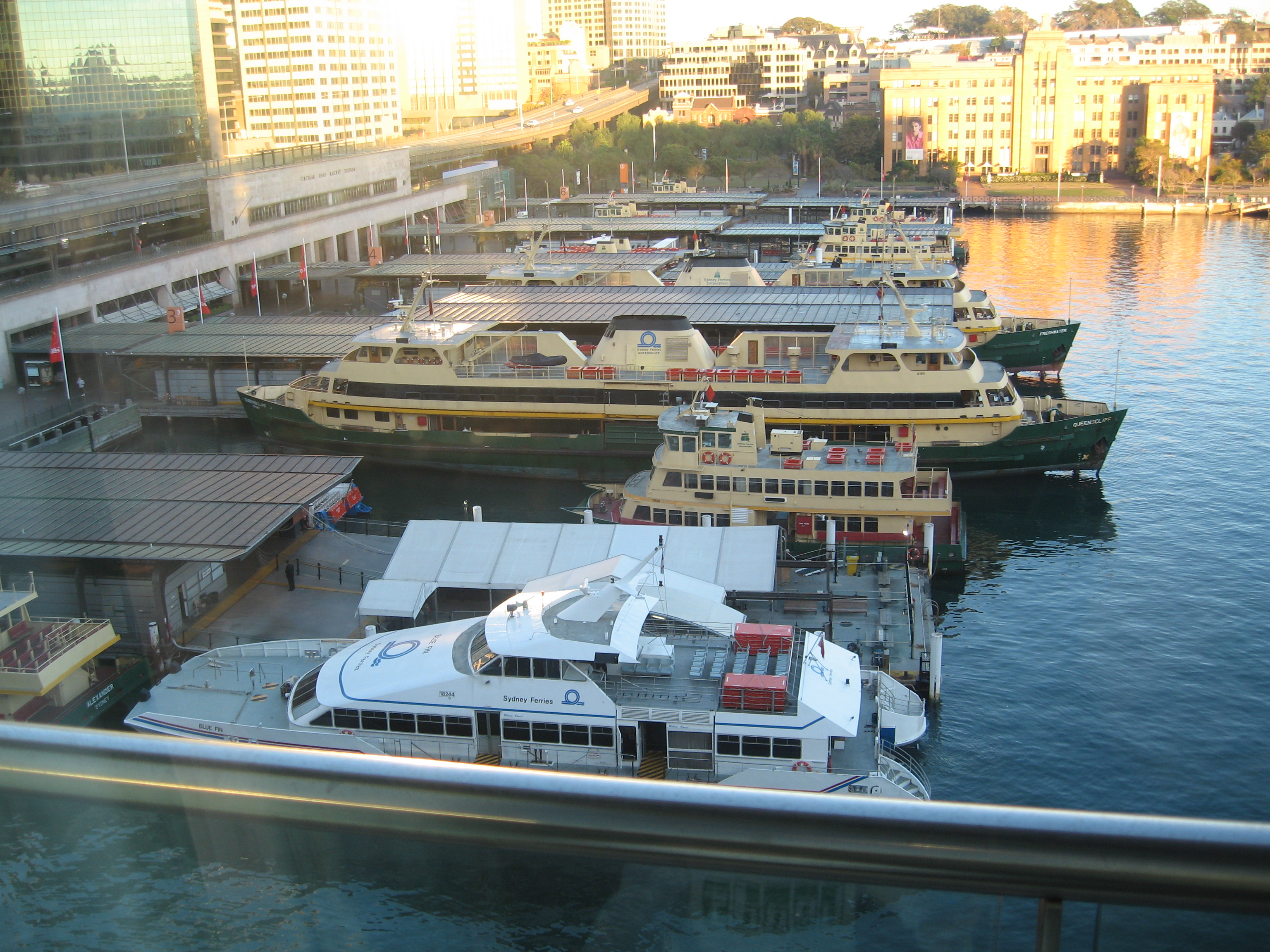
Sydney Harbour ferries at Circular Quay, including Sydney JetCats, Freshwater-class ferries and First Fleet-class ferries, 2005

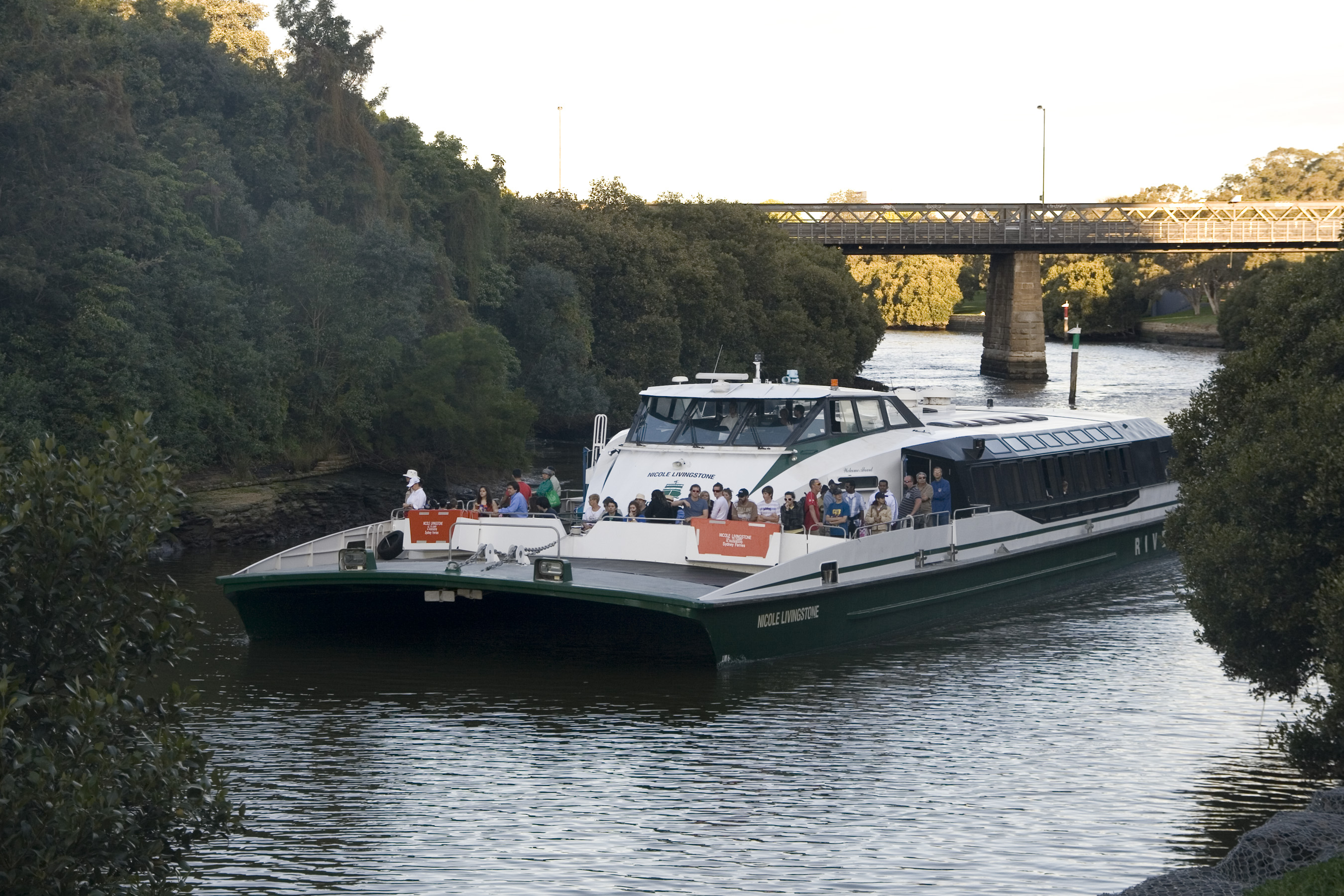
RiverCat type ferry, Nicole Livingstone, on the upper reaches of the Parramatta River

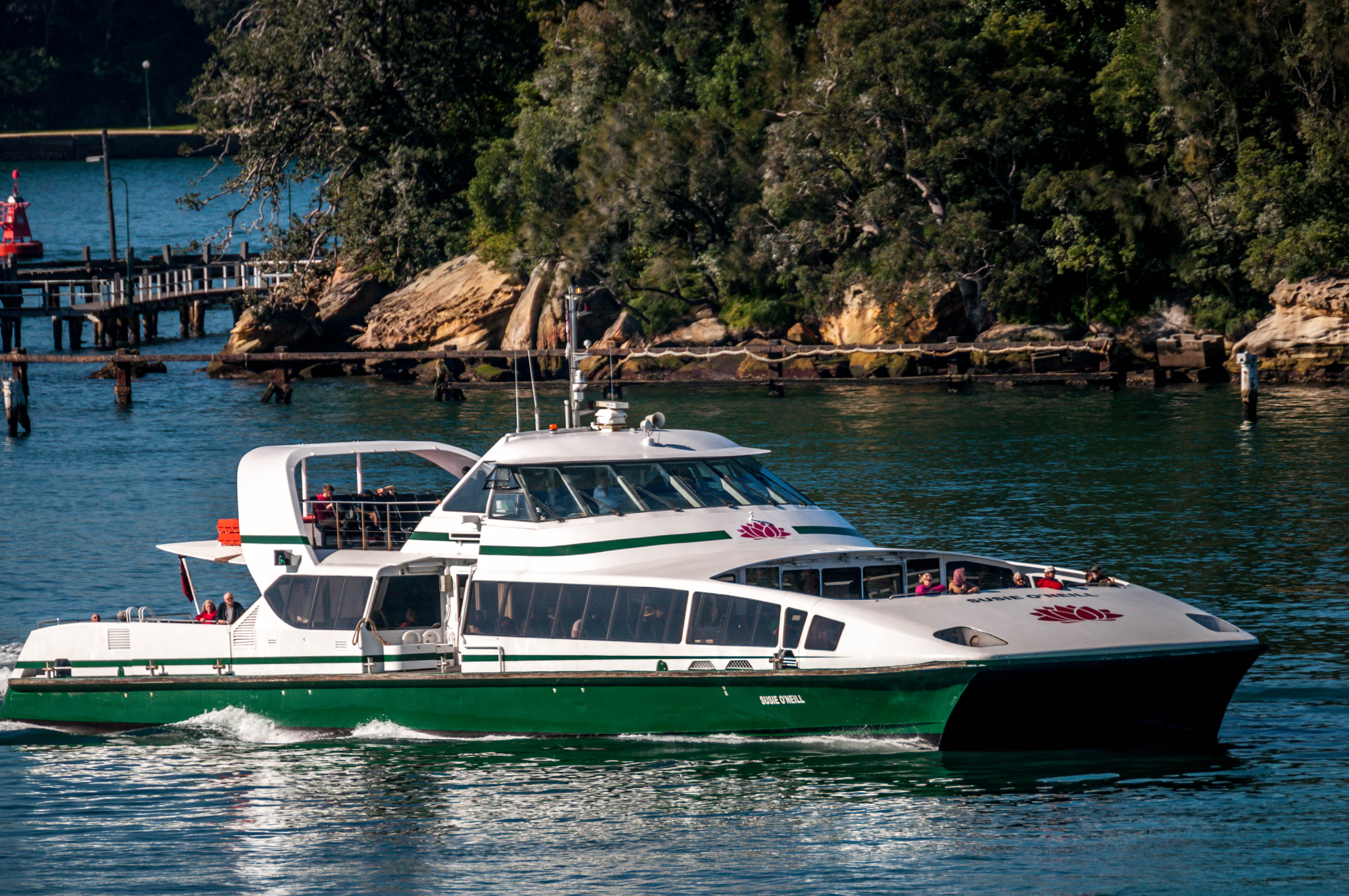
"SuperCats" were introduced in 2000 and 2001.

== 2010s and 2020s ==
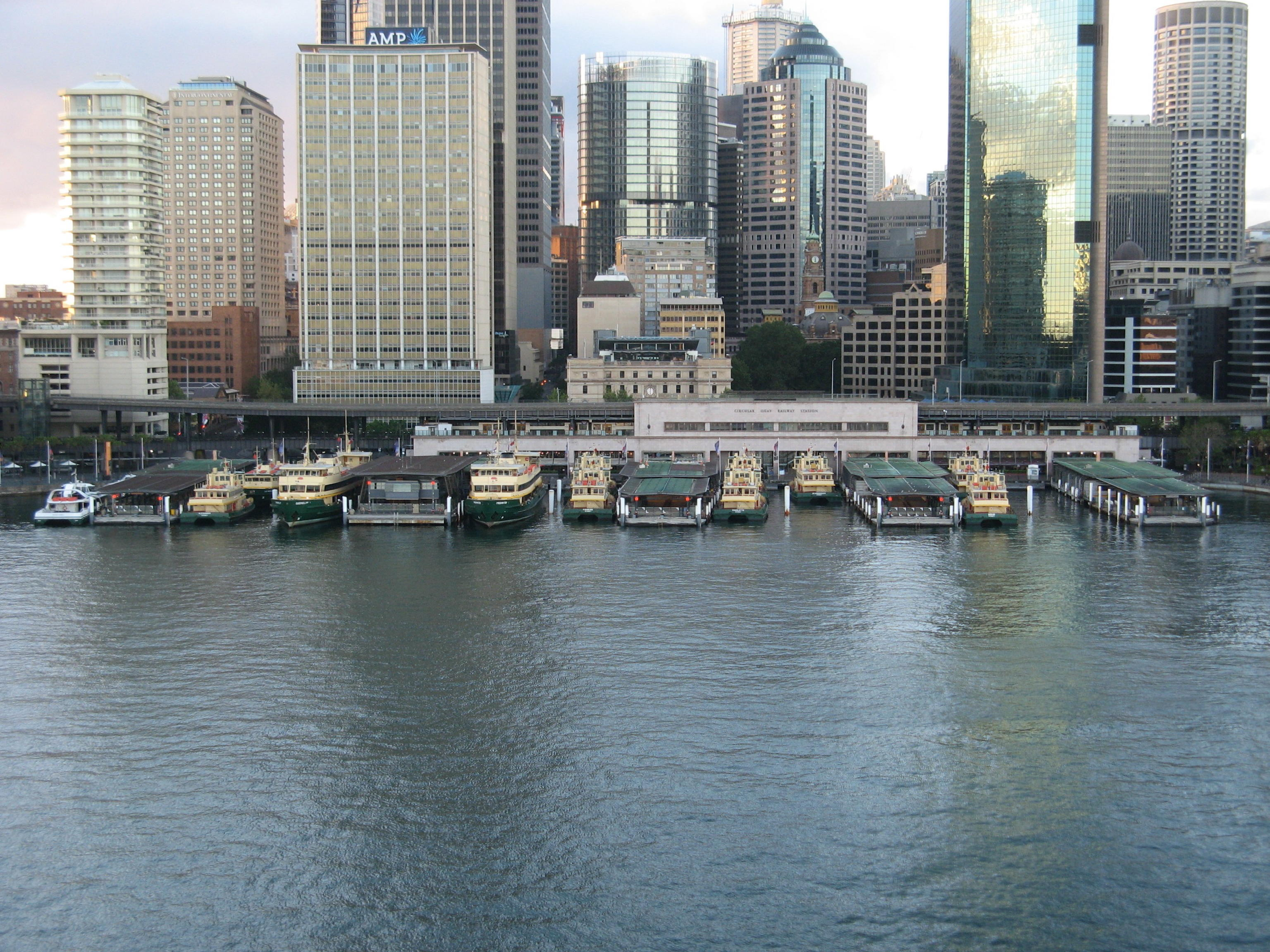
Much of the contemporary Sydney Ferries fleet at Circular Quay at dawn, including a SuperCat, two "Freshwater-class" Manly ferries, and eight of the nine First Fleet-class ferries, 2013

- On 1 April 2010 - Sydney Fast Ferries commences a five-year franchise to operate the former JetCat service between Circular Quay and Manly. The service only operates during peak-hour on weekdays.
- July 2012 - Harbour City Ferries becomes the contracted operator of Sydney Ferries services under contract.
- 1 April 2015 - The Bass & Flinders fleet commences with three existing and two leased vessels. Four new Incat built vessels are delivered by the end of the year, two 24 metres long and two 33 metres long.
- December 2016 - Harbour City Ferries became fully owned by Transdev Australasia after Transdev bought out Broadspectrum's 50% shareholding. As of December 2016, Harbour City Ferries employs more than 650 people and its fleet consisted of 32 vessels.
- 2017 - Bass & Flinders orders a third 33-metre fast ferry from Incat.
- June 2017 - The first of six new catamaran ferries, the "Emerald class", are introduced.
- September 2017 - Bass & Flinders is renamed Manly Fast Ferry.
- October 2017 - The introduction of the Emerald class ferries allows the final two Lady class ferries, Lady Northcott and Lady Herron, to be withdrawn in October 2017.
- December 2017 - The Manly Fast Ferry service is purchased by the NRMA.
- October 2018 - Fantasea Cruising is taken over by the NRMA with 10 ferries and 10 water taxis on Sydney Harbour and Pittwater.
- July 2019 - Harbour City Ferries commences a new contract to operate the ferries until June 2028. To coincide with the contract, Harbour City Ferries is rebranded Transdev Sydney Ferries.
- 2020 - The 35-year old "First Fleet-class" catamarans undergo major upgrades to provide them with another 10 years of service. The changes to all nine ferries include upgraded engines, refurbished interiors, the provision of air conditioning and additional safety features.
- June 2021 Manly Ferry Narrabeen is quietly taken out of service as her engine hours run out despite having another year still on her survey. This marks the beginning of the end for the Freshwater-Class ferries.
- October 2021 The first River-class ferry enters service.
- 13 October 2021 - Manly ferry Queenscliff (1983) is retired from service.
- 14 October 2021 - The first MiniCat-class ferry, Me-Mel, is launched as an on-demand service, which would eventually become the F10 Blackwattle Bay ferry service.
- 31 October 2021 The first of the new generation 2 Emerald-class ferries "Fairlight" enters service on the Manly ferry service.
- November 2021 The remaining 2 new Emerald-class ferries enter service.
- 8 December 2021 Plans to retire Manly ferry "Narrabeen" are scrapped and an engine rebuild commences on the vessel.
- 18 December 2021 SuperCat "Saint Mary Mackillop" is retired from service.
- 2022 The River-class ferries slowly enter service as numerous problems with the vessels are solved.
- 1 January 2022 Old Manly ferry Baragoola sinks at its wharf at the Coal Loader in Waverton.
- 12 March 2022 The new Emerald-class ferries are cleared to operate in swells up to 4.5 metres after growing concern that the vessels were not able to operate in high seas.
- 27 July 2022 HarbourCat "Anne Sargeant" is retired from service.
- September 2022 The Emerald Class ferries are withdrawn from service after two major steering failures. Freshwater & Collaroy return to service for nearly 2 weeks while problems are rectified.
- 16 February 2023 RiverCat "Betty Cuthbert" is retired from service.
- 6 June 2023 It is announced that the Manly ferries "Queenscliff" & "Narrabeen" will be returned to service after they were retired in 2021 while the "Collaroy" will be withdrawn from service in September. "Queenscliff" is expected to enter service in November 2023.
- 26 July 2023 HarbourCat "Pam Burridge" is retired from service.
- 27 September 2023 After 35 years of service, the Manly Ferry "Collaroy" is retired. She is moved to Cockatoo Island the following day to be docked alongside her sistership "Narrabeen" for long term storage.
- 27 November 2023 2 years after being retired, "Queenscliff" returns to service on the F1. This is the first time in Sydney Ferries' history that any vessel has been brought out of retirement.
- 22 March 2024 Supercat "Louise Sauvage" was retired from service
- 3 April 2024 First Parramatta River class ferry "Francis Bodkin" enters service.
- 28 April 2024 Supercat "Supercat 4" is retired from service
- 7 June 2024 Rivercat "Evonne Goolagong" is retired from service.
- July 2024 Parramatta River Class ferry "John Nutt" enters service.
- 28 October 2024 Rivercat "Nicole Livingstone" is retired from service
- 27 November 2024 Parramatta River Class ferry "Isobel Bennett" enters service
- 4 February 2025 Rivercat "Marlene Mathews" is retired from service
- 10 February 2025 Parramatta River Class ferry "Martin Green" enters service
- 3 June 2025 Parramatta River Class ferry “Ruby-Payne-Scott” enters service
- 3 June 2025 Rivercat “Marjorie Jackson” is retired from service
- 30 September 2025 Rivercat "Shane Gould" is retired from service
- 20 October 2025 4 years after being quietly withdrawn from service, "Narrabeen" returns to service on the F1, marking the second time a Sydney Ferry has been retired and returned to service.
- 5 December 2025 Parramatta River Class ferry "Norman Sefle" enters service
- 17 December 2025 Parramatta River Class ferry "Jack Mundey" enters service
- 9 March 2026 The last Rivercat "Dawn Fraser" is retired from service
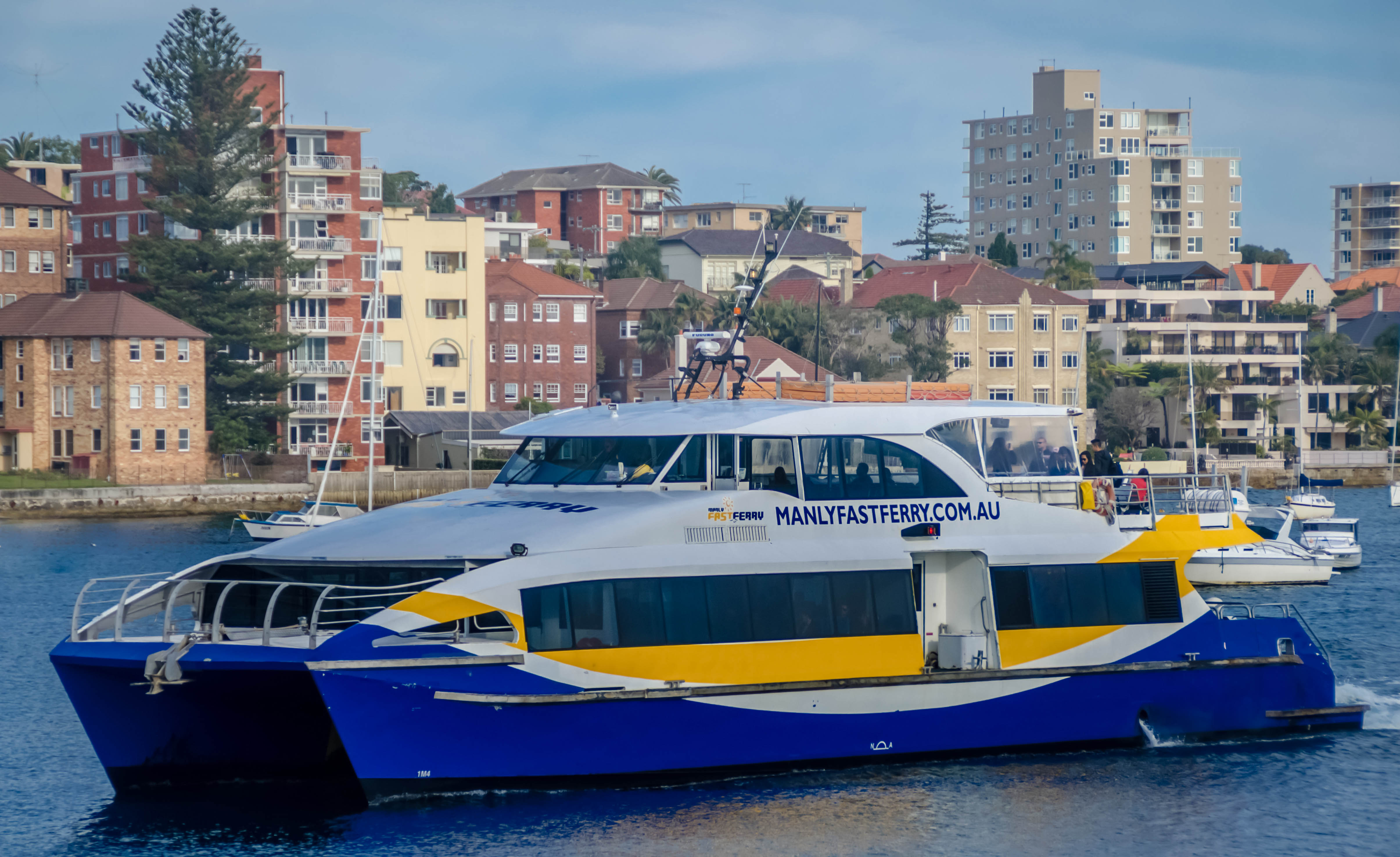
A Manly Fast Ferry vessel arriving at Manly Wharf, 2013

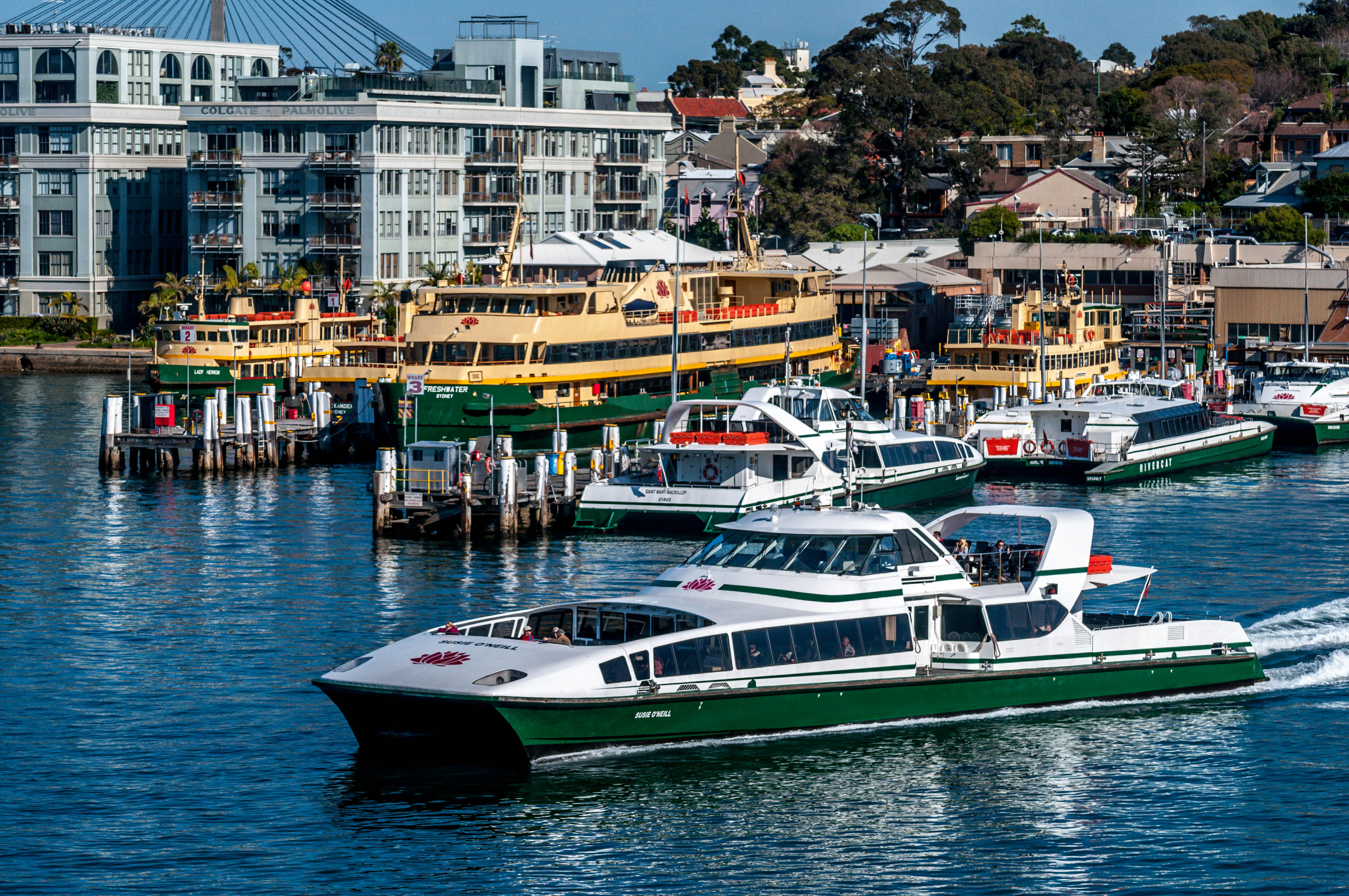
SuperCat Susie O'Neil at Sydney Ferries maintenance base, Balmain, 2013

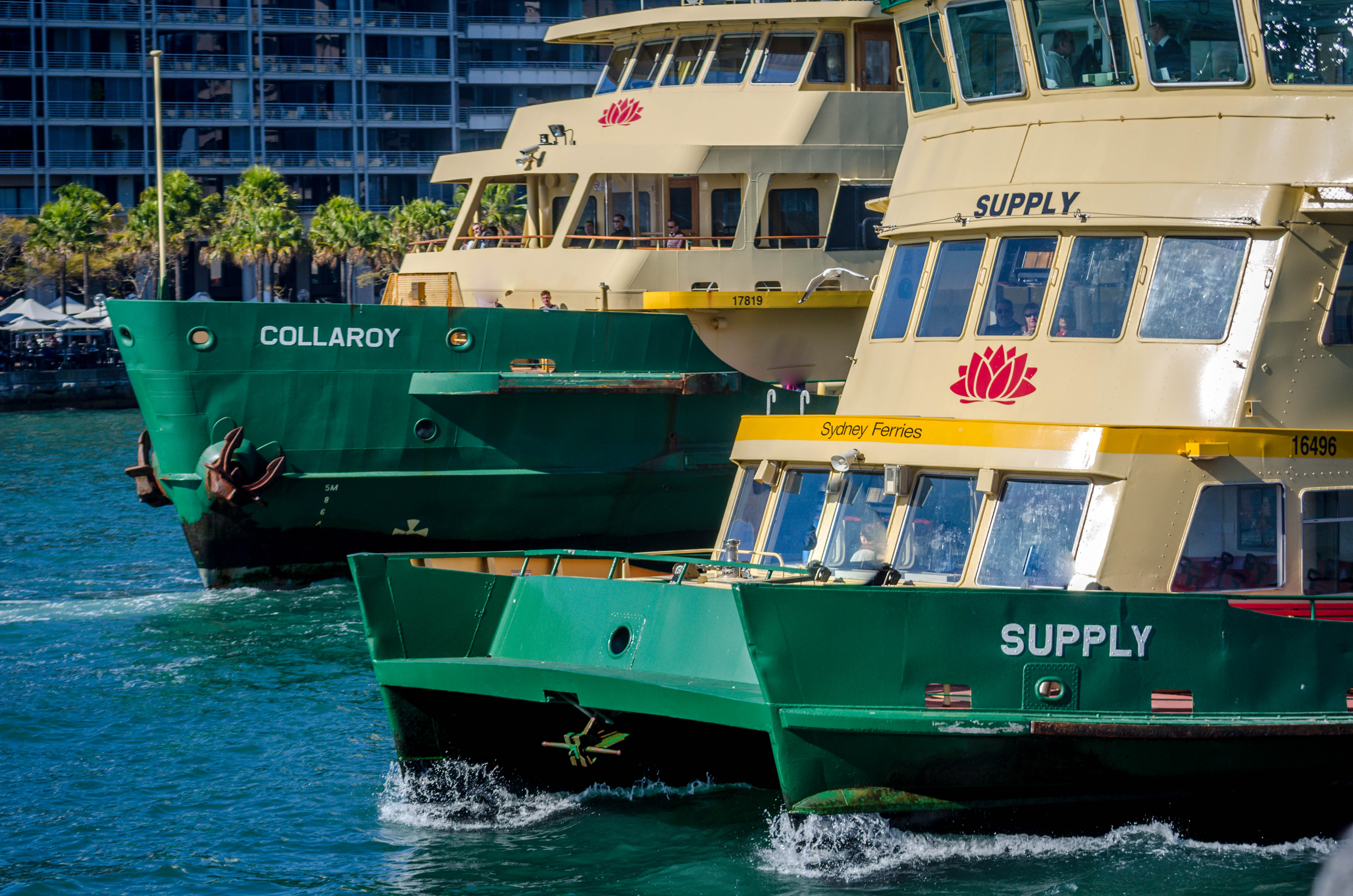
Collaroy (1988) and Supply (1984) in their current livery

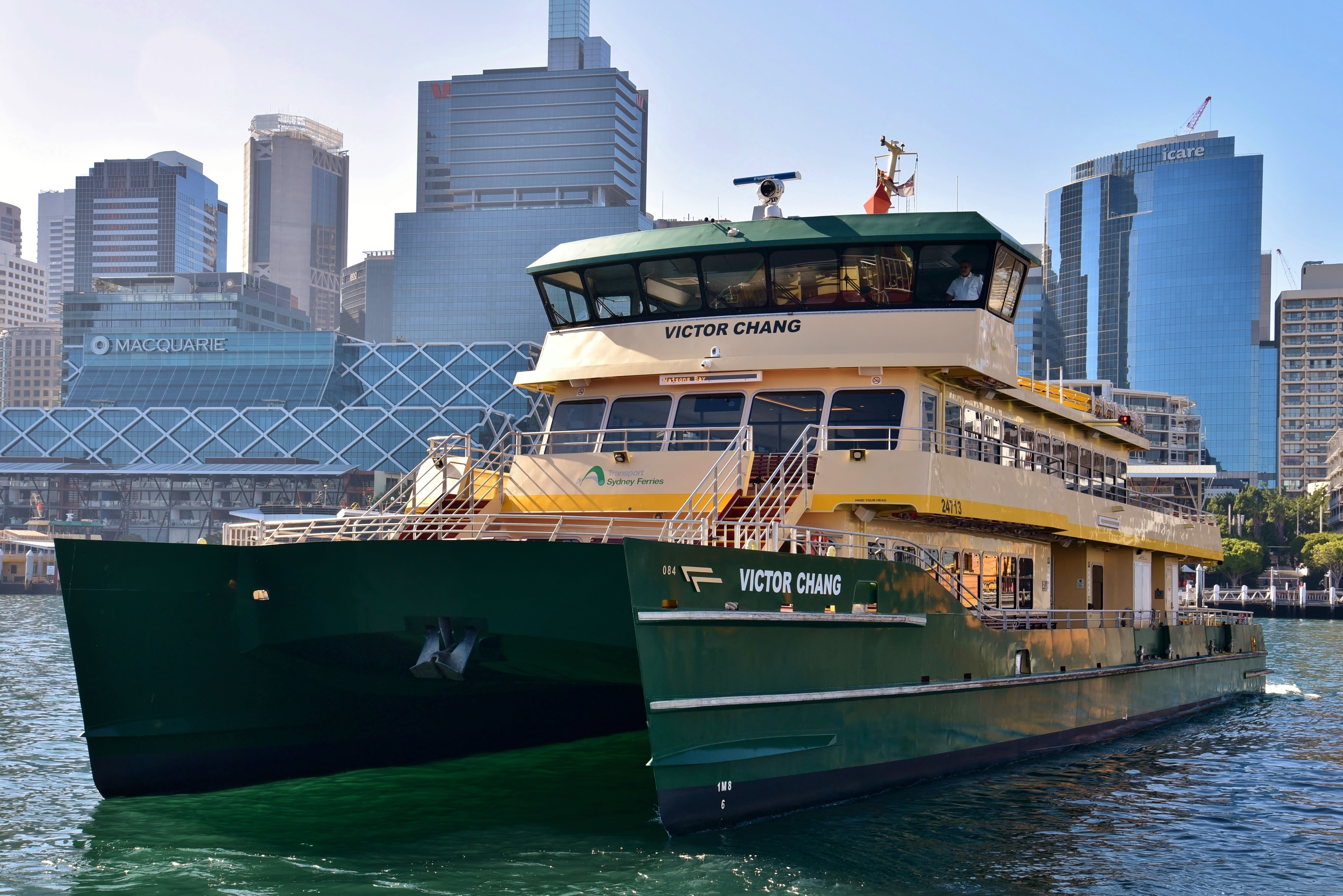
Emerald-class ferry, Victor Chang

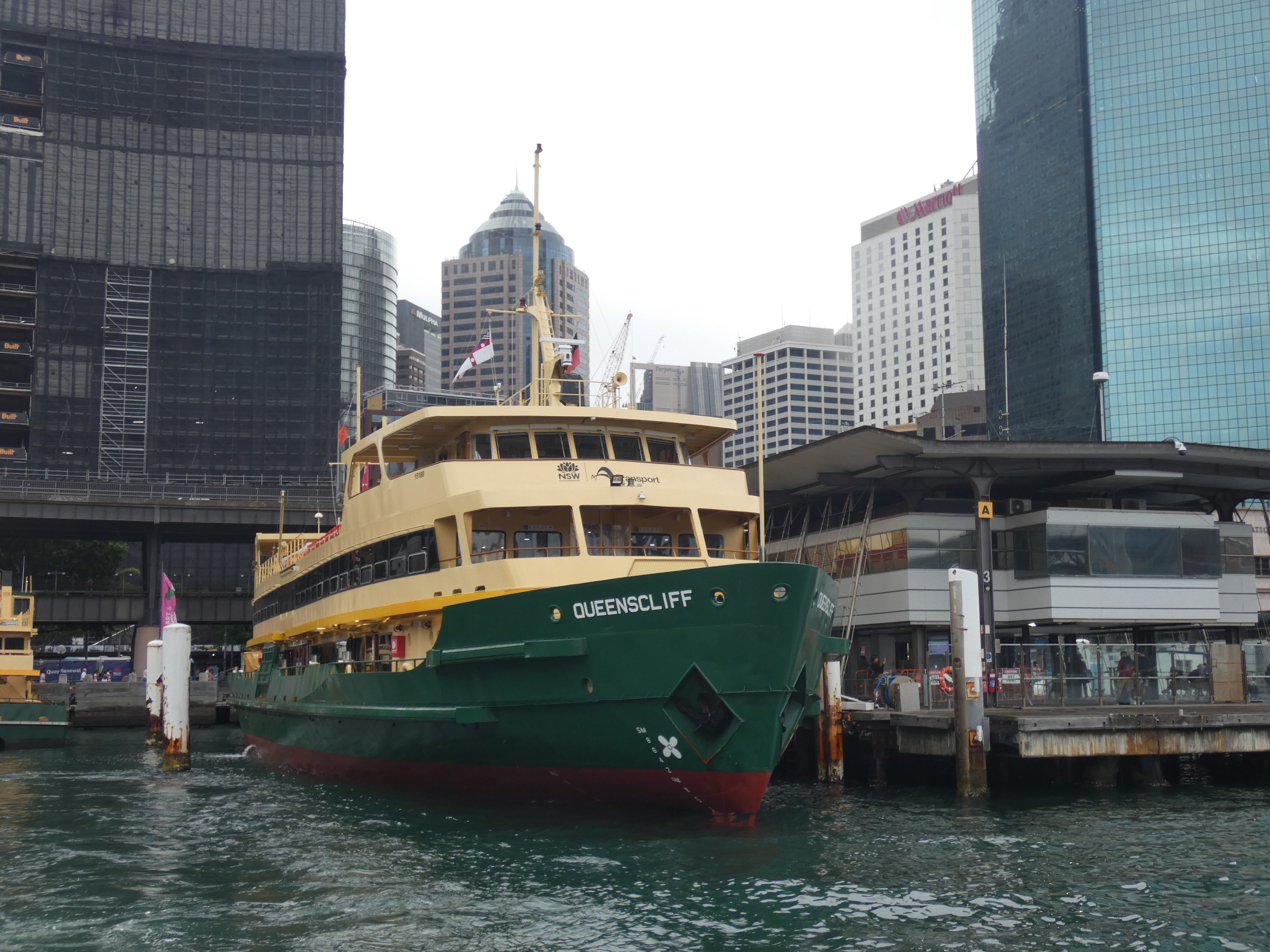
Freshwater-class ferry Queenscliff on her second day back in service in 2023

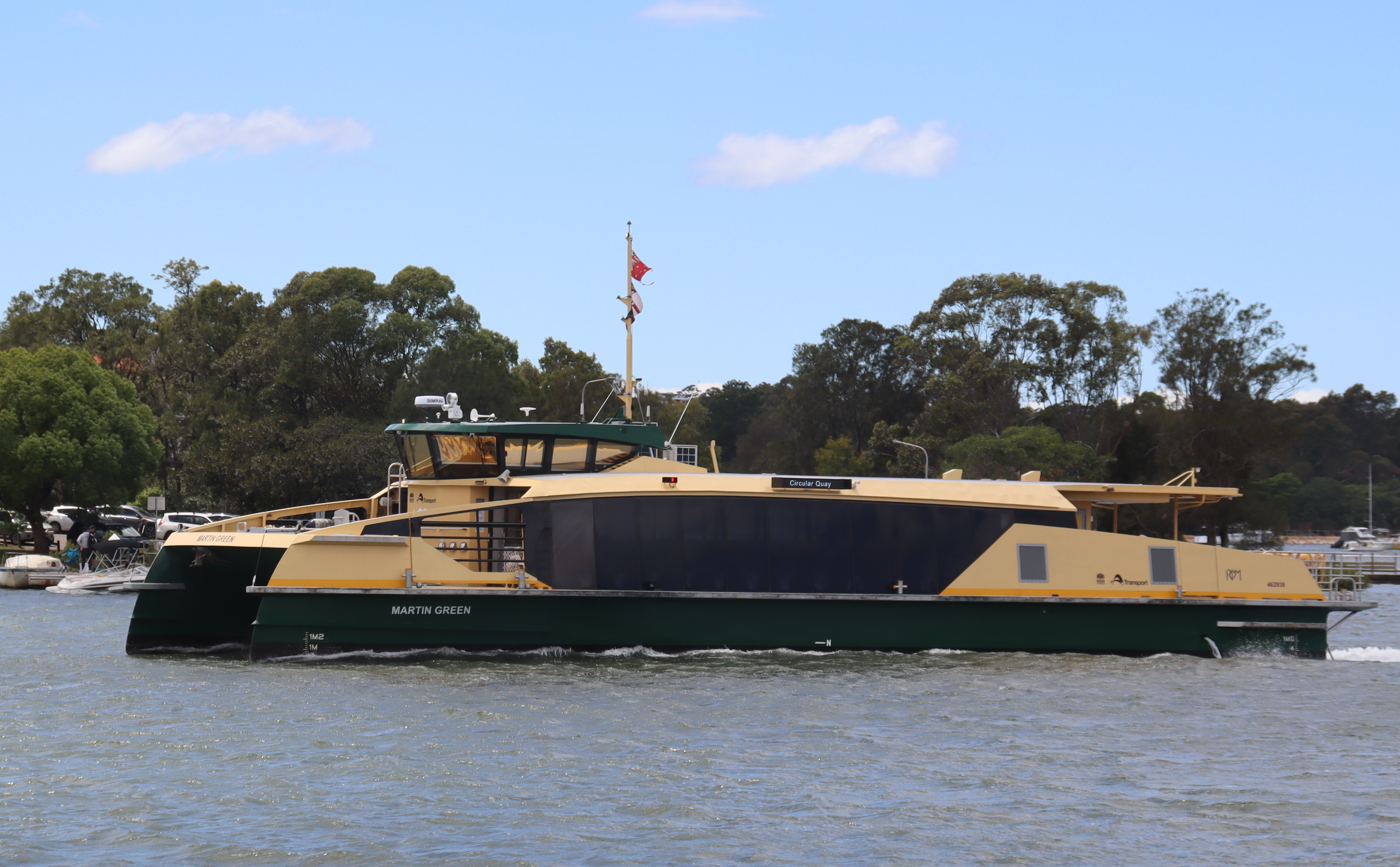
Parramatta River-class ferry MV Martin Green going up the Parramatta River

== See also ==
- List of Sydney Harbour ferries
