= List of Sydney Harbour ferries =

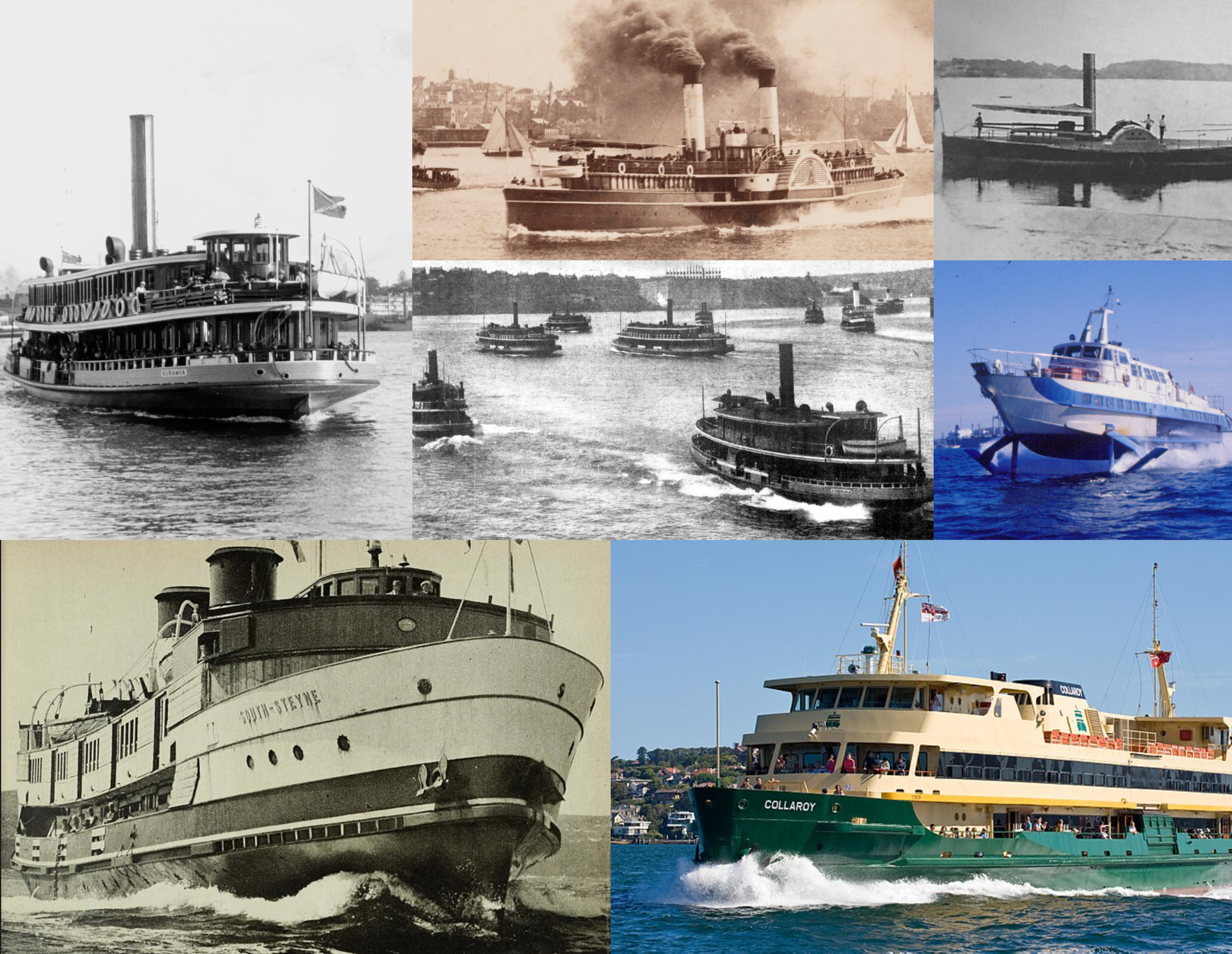
Top to bottom and left to right, Kuramia (1914–1934), PS Brighton (1883–1916), Herald (1855–1884), K-class ferries in Sydney Cove, hydrofoil Curl Curl (1973–1992), South Steyne (1938–1974), Collaroy (1988–2023)

Sydney Harbour's first ferries were sail and/or oar powered, but by the mid-19th century, paddle steamers were well established. Double-ended ferries became common as they did not require turning at terminating wharves in Sydney's busy but narrow bays, including at the main hub at Circular Quay. Double-ended ferries, however, provided technological challenges for screw (propeller) propulsion and Sydney's shift from paddle steamers to screw ferries in the closing years of the nineteenth century was relatively late. Diesel power first came to Sydney Harbour ferries mainly through the conversion of existing steam ferries to diesel in the 1930s and the 1950s, when during the slow post-Bridge decades ferry companies could generally not afford new ferries. Hydrofoils were introduced to the Manly run in the 1960s and 1970s halving travel times for those willing to pay a premium fare. Government investment in new vessels during the 1970s and 1980s saw the replacement of the surviving early twentieth century vessels. New vessels included modern Lady-class ferries, four large Manly ferries, and nine First-Fleet ferries. The most recent decades have seen the introduction of the RiverCats, JetCats, SuperCats, Emerald-class, River-class, and Parramatta River-class ferries. Apart from the three Manly "Freshwater-class" ferries, the current Sydney Ferries fleet comprises all catamarans.

== List ==
Name	Year built	Description	Origin of name	Tons	Length (m)	Passengers	Class/type	Out of service	Image
Rose Hill Packet	1789	A hoy launched in 1789, in the year following the settlement of Sydney. Also known as 'The Lump', it was used to transport goods and passengers up the Parramatta River. The return journey could take a week between Sydney and Parramatta.	Short-lived name for the settlement in Parramatta, which soon adopted the name of the Burramattagal people.	12 tons (bm)	11 m-13 m		Packet or Hoy	c.1800	
Surprise	1831	Launched in 1831 in Neutral Bay for the Parramatta service, Surprise was the first Australian built steamship and the first steam ferryboat in Sydney. In service for six months with limited financial success. Her draught was too deep for the route and she was sent to Tasmania. Sold to Hobart in 1832.		40 tons	24 m		Paddle steamer	1832	
Sophia Jane	1826	An auxiliary steamer, built in the United Kingdom in 1826, arrived in Sydney in 1831 and fitted out for excursions around the harbour with limited financial success. She was too deep in the draft for Parramatta River service and was used on coastal trips north and south of Sydney.			38 m		Auxiliary steamer		
Experiment	1832	Due to high cost and difficulty in sourcing steam engines at the time, this vessel used horses on treadmill attached to a central wheel to propel her via paddle wheels. Provided a Sunday's-only service to Balmain from 1840. Converted to steam and in 1846 was sent to Brisbane to become that town's first ferry.	Unusually had horses drive paddle wheels.	38 tons	24 m	100	Paddle steamer	1846	
Australia	1834	Paddle steamer built for £200 by the newly-formed Australia Steam Conveyance Company for Parramatta service. 12 hp (9 kW) steam engines. With little opposition apart from sailing craft that struggled with river currents and tides, she was a financial success with the company paying a dividend in 1836 of 38 per cent. Withdrawn from Parramatta service following the introduction of Comet (1843) and used on Balmain, Five Dock, and Iron Cove runs.		45 tons	25.3 m		Paddle steamer	1863	
Rapid	1837	Second vessel ordered by the Australian Steam Conveyance Company following the success of Australia (1834). Built in the United Kingdom and sent to Sydney for re-assembly. The first double-ended ship in Australia. Copper boiler, 20 hp (14.9 kW) engine, iron hulled. Ninety-minute trip on Parramatta service. Ran aground at Glebe Point in 1863 where she was used as a house-boat.						1852	
Kangaroo	1840	Paddle steamer built for Parramatta service. Bought in 1847 by Tasmanian Government for use in Hobart. Later worked in Melbourne until 1891.	Australian native animal					1847	
Raven		Paddle steamer built for Parramatta service.					Paddle steamer		
Waterman	1844	Paddle steamer built for Parramatta service. 8 hp engine. Began frequent services to Balmain run by Messrs Flood, Perdriau and Fennmore but the small ferry was unreliable and not popular.		17 tons	15 m		Paddle steamer	1874	
William IV		Unusual style of paddle wheel.							
Emu	1843	Double-ended iron paddle steamer built for Parramatta service and later serviced Balmain route. Similar to Black Swan and Pelican. Assembled from parts imported from the United Kingdom. Her 1-metre draft was well-suited to river work. 30 hp (22.4 kW) jet-condensing steam engine drove 4.2m paddle wheels, giving speed that was stiff competition for the older Australia. Successful ferry that ran on Parramatta River service for 20 years. Also use from 1855 as inaugural weekday service twice a day to Manly. Later transferred to the Balmain run. Wrecked 24 April 1884.	Australian native bird	65 tons	28.6 m	150	Paddle steamer	1884	
Comet	1843	Wooden paddle steamer built by William Lowe in Clarencetown for Parramatta service. 35 hp triple expansion steam engine. until bought in 1852 by syndicate that included Thomas Mort. Sold again the following year for £3,100 and transferred to Melbourne. Bought in 1862 and sent to New Zealand but sank en route.		50 tons	30.1 m		Paddle steamer	1862	More images...
Native	1844	Boiler exploded in 1850, renamed Maid of the Mill and later sold to Brisbane.			18.3 m		Paddle steamer	1862	
Ferry Queen	1844	Built at Thomas Chowne's yard at Pyrmont and used by brothers Thomas and James Gerrard to run from Windmill Street to Blues Point, the first regular cross-harbour ferry service. Also used to haul pints of produce and livestock.	-	8 tons		40		Unknown	More images...
Gypsy Queen	1844	Wooden paddle steamer built by Thomas Chowne, Pyrmont for Gerrard brothers.	-	8 tons		40			
Brothers	1847	Unlike most of the Harbour's early paddle steamers, she was not an excursion boat but a ferry. Served on a variety of early routes and was one of the first regular Manly ferries. A Gerrard Brothers boat.	Named after owners John and Joseph Gerrard.		50 tons	20.6 m	50 passengers	1886	
Cobra	1849	Iron paddle tug built in Swansea, South Wales. Designed as a tug-tender, she worked in Melbourne then Launceston, and then Hobart before working in Sydney from 1869. Her main Sydney role was a tug, and sometimes as a cargo vessel. On occasion, she would transport passengers to Manly. Transferred to Newcastle in 1874, and lasted until c. 1917.						1874 (to Newcastle)	
Agenoria	1850	a Gerrard Brothers boat. Sold to Melbourne 1852.		22 tons	15.8 m			1852	
Victoria	1851	Iron paddle steamer. Built by Thomas Wingate & Co, Whiteinch, Scotland. 60 hp. Owned by E Manning from 1856 to 1863. She provides the first regular Manly service from 1856. Taken off Manly service 1860. Sold to Japan in 1863, sunk 1864.		107 tons (1861, 132 tons)	37.7 m (1861, 47.0 m)	200 approx.		1860	
Star	1852	Wrecked in 1857		44 tons	22.3 m			1857	
Mystery	1852	Wooden paddle steamer built by Money Wigram & Co, Northam, England. 60 hp 2 x grasshopper side lever steam engines by George Butchard. 9 knots. 60 hp 2 x oscillating steam engines. 11 knots. Imported by Manly Ferry Company to join Royal Alfred as a tug, cargo carrier, and excursion ferry. Converted to a lighter 1893		141 tons	40.3 m	750		1893	
Breadalbane	1853	Iron paddle steamer built by Smith and Rogers, Glasgow. 80 hp steeple steam by builder. lengthened 1856		144 tons (1856: 161 tons)	42.7 m (1856: 44.6 m)	200		1883 broken up	
Huntress	1853	Wooden paddle steamer built by Newtown and Malcolm, Manning River, NSW. 2 x 60 hp steam engines by G. Russel & Co. 11 knots. Lengthened 1856		86 tons	27.2 m			1860 sold to New Zealand, wrecked 15 March 1872	
Black Swan	1854	[O/N 32481 Iron paddle steamer built by C.J. Mare & Co, Blackwell, England and reassembled in Sydney for Parramatta service. 35 hp oscillating steam engine. Sister to Pelican, similar to Emu. In 1859 and 1860, ran Sunday and holiday services to Mosman with Perri. Also used to provide services to Manly. Rebuilt and lengthened in 1865. Wrecked 4 June 1868.		40 tons, 1865: 69 tons	27.6 m, 1865: 33.5 m	150	Paddle steamer	1868, wrecked	
Pelican	1854	Paddle steamer built for Parramatta service. Sister to Black Swan, similar to Emu. Also used to provide services to Manly. Sank 3 April 1888.		42 tons	27.6 m	165	Paddle steamer	1888	
Herald	1854	A Gerrard Brothers boat, sent out in sections from England. Steered by a tiller at either end, she often worked as a tug. Richard Hayes Harnett used her from 1871 to start a ferry service to Mosman Bay, and used on most runs across her career. She sank off North Head in 1884 while waiting to tow a ship into the harbour.			22.9 m	50		1884	More images...
Premier	1856			19 tons	23.2 m		Paddle steamer	1891	
Pearl (I)	1856	Iron paddle steamer, sister to Peri, lengthened in 1866. Built for S. Crook and E. Manning 13 hp 2-cylinder steam engine, re-engined 1866, 40 hp steam		11 tons, 1866: 41 tons	16.8 m, 1866: 31.0 m		Paddle steamer	1891	
Peri	1856			22 tons	16.8 m		Paddle steamer	1886	
Nautilus (I)	1856	A North Shore Ferry company vessel.		36 tons	16 m			1891	
Phantom	1858	Iron paddle steamer built in Melbourne by J Daw, most of her service was on Manly run for the Brighton and Manly Beach Steam Company. The first of the large double-ended Manly ferries. 50 hp steam engine. Also thought to be the first vessel in the long-standing Manly ferry livery of dark green hull and white funnel with black topping. Long and narrow (beam 4.0 m) paddle steamer with shallow draft made for unpleasant rides across Sydney Heads in bad weather. Broken up in Pyrmont c. 1886		63 tons	36.3 m	160	Manly ferry, paddle steamer	1886	More images...
Ysobel	1860	Built by P.N. Russell & Co. Sydney. Joubert's first ferry, to Hunters Hill. Possibly Sydney's first screw-propelled ferryboat; however, there is no confirmation that it was not a paddle steamer.							
Kirribilli (I)	1861	A small double-ended wooden paddle steamer steered with a tiller at either end. Built by John Cuthbert, Sydney. 8 hp power steam engine. First ferry in North Shore Ferry Company. Then transferred to be the second ferry on the Hunters Hill run.	Kirribilli, a harbourside northern Sydney suburb with an Australian Aboriginal name meaning 'good fishing spot'.	11 tons	60			1879, wrecked	
Cygnet	1862	Paddle steamer built for Parramatta service. In the early 1890s, used by the Manly Co-operative Steam Ferry Limited set up to compete, ultimately unsuccessfully, with the Port Jackson Steamship Company. Re-engined in 1879, hulked in August 1891.	young swan	30 tons	27.1 m		Paddle steamer	1891	
Gypsy Queen		a Gerrard Brothers boat. Took over from Waterman on the Balmain run in 1846.							
Goolwa	1864	Iron paddle steamer built. Part time Manly ferry and tug. Built by Palmer Brothers, Jarrow-on-tyne, England. 2 90 hp steam engines supplied by J Thompson & Co. Owned by Newcastle Co-operative Steam Tug Co. Ltd. Hulked and abandoned near Hexham Bridge c 1919		191 tons	39.6 m		Paddle steamer	1876	
Emu (II), later Brightside	1865	Originally built in 1865 as Emu (II) by A & J Inglis, Glasgow and re-assembled at Kangaroo Point, Brisbane for use on Brisbane River and Moreton Bay. Originally owned by Queensland Steam Navigation Company. Came to Port Jackson Steamboat Company in January 1877 through to 1909. Renamed Brightside in 1887. Sank in 1897, converted to cargo vessel in 1902 and worked the Manly route until 1908 when she was gutted by fire. Converted to a lighter, and broken up in 1909.		269 tons	52.1 m	800	Paddle steamer	1908	More images...
Adelaide, later Swan	1866	Double-ended paddle steamer on Parramatta River service for Parramatta River Steamship Company with several subsequent owners. Rebuilt and renamed Swan in 1879. Thought to have been broken up around 1900.						1900(?)	
Transit	1866	A North Shore Ferry company vessel.		69 tons	24 m				More images...
Galatea	1868	A North Shore Ferry company vessel.			21 m				
Royal Alfred	1868	Wooden paddle steamer built by George Beddoes, Auckland. 60 hp 2 x oscillating steam engines. 11 knots. First regular saloon steamer on Manly service. Also used as a tug, cargo carrier, and excursion ferry.		141 tons	40.3 m	750		1893	Photo taken in c.1890.
Florence	1872	Wooden screw steamer built by W. Dunn, Lavender Bay. 8 hp steam engine by Chapman & Co. A North Shore Ferry company vessel. Provided first regular daytime runs to Mosman.		15 tons	16.9 m			1900	
Coombra	1872	A North Shore Ferry company vessel. Burnt out 1888.		45 tons	23.8 m			1888	
Leipoa	1872	Wooden paddle steamer. Built by Mort's Dock & Engineering Co. Ltd, Balmain. 19 hp steam engine by builder. H. Perdriau's Balmain Steam Ferry Co Ltd. broken up c. 1918.	Scientific name for Malleefowl	49 tons	27.4 m			1918	
Aberona	187?	Serviced the Mosman and Neutral Bay routes							
Bungaree (Beengaree)	1873		Horse punt	61 tons	23.7 m	(punt)		1900	More images...
Nautilus (II)	1873	Wooden screw steamer, built 1873 by W Dunn, Lavender Bay, for Parramatta River Steam Company. Ran a free service from along Tarban Creek to Hunters Hill wharf to meet river ferries. Later North Shore Ferry Company, then Sydney Ferries Limited. 8 hp steam engine by Vale & Lacey.		11 tons	14.0 m	75		1919, broken up	More images...
Glenelg	1874	A Port Jackson Steamship Co iron screw steamer. One of several tug-ferries used about the port and on the Manly run. Built by Aitken & Mansel, Whiteinch, Scotland. 80 hp compound steam engine by Rait & Lindsey.		210 tons	41.4 m			1900, sank 25 March	
Darra	1875	A North Shore Ferry company vessel.		57 tons	24.9 m			1883	
Nellie	1877	Wooden paddle steamer. Built by Duncan & Sorrie, Balmain, NSW. 16 hp triple expansion steam by Mort's Dock & Engineering Co. Ltd. Sold to Newcastle. Fate unknown		69 tons	25.4 m			?	
Commodore	1878	Manly iron paddle steamer. Originally had twin funnels. Sold to Newcastle in 1926 for use as a tug. Scuttled 8 September 1931		187 tons				1926	More images...
Victor	1878	A Gerrard Brothers boat.		24 tons	15.8 m			?	
Nell	1878	A North Shore Ferry company vessel. Wrecked 1883.		71 tons	25.4 m			1883	
Fairlight	1878	Paddle steamer on Manly run. Built in Scotland and sailed and paddled to Sydney. The third double-ended steamer on the Manly run and first to be specifically designed for the route. Converted to two lighters in Brisbane.	Fairlight, a harbourside northern Sydney suburb and beach near Manly.	315 tons	52.1 m	950	Manly ferry, paddle steamer	1914.	More images...
Telephone	1878	Wooden paddle steamer. Built by H. Perdriau. 40-hp compound diagonal steam engine by Atlas Engineering Co.		85 tons	31.9 m			-	
Wallaby	1879	Sydney's first double-ended screw ferry, and the second in the world. This remained the basic design of all Sydney double-ended screw ferries. Unusually, lower deck passenger area was full width of hull with no bulwarks. Converted to a tug in 1918, then a lighter, and broken up in 1926.	A native Australian animal	163 tons	32.9 m	329	-	1918	More images...
Osprey, later Lilac	1879	Screw steamer. Built as 'Osprey' in 1879 by W Dunn, Berry's Bay. 11 hp steam engine by Vale & Lacey. Sold to the North Shore Steam Ferry Co. in 1892 and renamed Lilac.		35 tons	20.2 m	200	-		
Benelon	1880	Wooden paddle steamer, double-ended vehicular ferry. Built in 1885 by David Drake. Sunk in 1923 after collision with North Coast steamer Burringba without loss of passenger life; however, a number of horses went down with the ferry to much public outcry.	Bennelong was a senior man of the Eora.	204 tons	36.6 m	28 vehicles, 84 passengers	Vehicular ferry	1932.	More images...
Millie	1880	Wooden paddle steamer built by W Dunn at Berry's Bay. 25 hp steam engine by Mort's Dock and Engineering. Converted to a lighter 1902, broken up 1910		81 tons	21.3 m			1902	More images...
St Leonards	1880	Paddle steamer, decommissioned in 1901 and used as floating pontoon at Neutral Bay and Hunters Hill	St Leonards, a northern Sydney suburb.	110 tons	33.5 m	475	-	1901.	More images...
Alathea, Aleathea	1881	Built by Rock Davis. Both decks largely closed in. Sydney's first electrically lit ferry, and one of the first double-ended screw ferries. North Shore Steam Ferry company bought her from Parramatta River Steam and Tram Company. Travelling at 6.5 knots, she lost the 'forward' propeller and her speed immediately increased to 9 knots. 1892 re-engined (50 hp compound steam by Bow, McLachlan % Co) and converted to single-ended vessel with her lower deck closed in. Converted to lighter in 1913 and her engines placed in the Karingal launched that year.		79 tons, 1892: 120 tons	33.3 m	500		1913	More images...
Defiance	1881	Wooden screw steamer built by Rock Davis, Blackwall for C Jeanneret for Parramatta River service. 25 hp steam engine by Plenty & Sons. Sold to Adelaide 1888, broken up 1930		64 tons	25.2 m	370		1888	
Rose	1881	Wooden screw steamer on Joubert's Lane Cove River service. Built by W Dunn, Berrys Bay, 12 hp steam engine. To Melbourne 1891, returned to Sydney 1898, burnt out 7 October 1916		43 tons	20.4 m			1916	More images...
Lily	1882	Wooden screw steamer. Built J. Piper, Balmain, NSW. 20 hp triple expansion steam engine. Spent much of her time on the Circular Quay to Neutral Bay run. In 1894, collided with Manly ferry, Conqueror, smashing in 10 feet of her bow and partially sinking her. Conqueror suffered minor damage. Broken up 1911		66 tons	23.0 m	250	-	1911	More images...
Eagle, later Cygnet	1882	Wooden screw steamer. Built by W Dunn, Berry's Bay. 25 hp steam engine by Chapman & Co. Renamed Cygnet 1899. Converted to houseboat 1931. Fate unknown		74 tons	23.9 m	370	-	1931	As built as Eagle.
Balmain	1883	Paddle steamer. Built by B.S. Bridges of Balmain for the Balmain Steam Ferry Company. From 1901, run by the Balmain New Ferry Company. Replaced by the second series of Lady class ferries and broken up around 1910.	Balmain, a harbourside inner west Sydney suburb.	117 tons	36.5 m		Paddle steamer	1910	More images...
Brighton	1883	Iron-hulled paddler. Built by T.B. Sheath & Co., Rutherglen, Scotland. A popular well-appointed Manly ferry. The largest paddle steamer ever operated on Sydney Harbour and the last on the Manly run. She was sold in 1916 becoming a store ship in Port Stephens. Sunken hull remains in Port Stephens.	Brighton in England, which was also an alternate name for Manly in the mid-19th century		67.1 m	1200	Manly ferry, paddle steamer	1916	More images...
Pearl (II)	1883	Wooden screw steamer on Joubert's Lane Cove River service. Built by J Piper for Lane Cove River service, Balmain for D & N Joubert. 10 hp steam engine. To Brisbane, 1883. Sunk in Brisbane River 13 February 1896. Hulk discovered on 19 February off Hancock Brothers Wharf, South Brisbane. Raised onto Peter's slip on Friday 6 March.		41 tons	17.9 m	360		1883, sank 1896 in Brisbane	More images...
Port Jackson	1883	Screw steamer used as Manly cargo vessel with passenger facilities. Could also be used as a tug.	Port Jackson, the body of water encompassing Sydney's three harbours.	108 tons					More images...
Victoria	1883	Paddle steamer built by Watty Ford of Berry's Bay. Typical of the shape of North Shore Steam Ferry Company's double-ended paddle fleet. Incorporated into Sydney Ferry Company's fleet in 1900. Transferred to Melbourne about 10 years later.		119 tons	34.1 m	434		1910(?) to Melbourne	More images...
Warrane	1883	Wooden paddle steamer double-ended vehicular ferry. Built by WM Ford, Berry's Bay NSW. £3,068 40 hp diagonal steam engine by Chapmen & Co. By 1919, she required extensive overhaul and was used as a stand-by boat. O/N: 83737	Australian Aboriginal name for "Sydney Cove"	109 tons	30.2 m	14 vehicles, 144 passengers	Vehicular ferry	1931	
Halcyon	1884			82 tons	30.2 m	290		1933	More images...
Gannet	1884			48 tons	19.8 m	213		1930s	More images...
Cammeray	1884	Later used as floating pontoon and wharf.	The northern Sydney suburb of Cammeray, which is named after the Cammeraygal peoples	197 tons	39.3 m	675		1908	More images...
Iris	1884	Wooden screw steamer. Cargo ferry lighter. Built by J Lynch, Balmain for D & N Joubert. 10 hp compound steam engine by Alexander. Broken up 1928.		35 tons	18.3 m			1928	More images...
Pearl (III)	1884	Wooden screw steamer. Built by J Lynch, Balmain for D & N Joubert. 25 hp compound steam engine. Burnt in 1911, converted to houseboat, fate unknown.		76 tons	23.9 m			1911	
Possum	1884	Wooden screw steamer. Built by Rock Davis, Blackwall. 12 hp steam engine by Chapman & Co. First all-night North Shore service. Sunk 1911		32 tons	17.8 m			1911	
Neutral Bay, later Thelma	1885	Renamed Thelma in 1897.	Neutral Bay, a harbourside northern Sydney suburb.	50 tons	21.0 m			1920s	
Bunya Bunya	1885	Typical of Sydney Harbour paddle steamer ferries, she was the largest and last of them. Sold in 1910 and used as a pontoon at Gladesville Bridge wharf. Sister to Waratah (II).	Araucaria bidwillii, the bunya pine	202 tons	64.6 m	688	Paddle steamer	1914	More images...
Waratah (II)	1885	Paddle steamer. Later used as floating pontoon and wharf. Sister to Bunya Bunya.	Australian-endemic genus of large shrubs including the NSW State floral emblem.	197 tons	36.6 m	695	Paddle steamer	1910	More images...
Ente	1886	Balmain paddle steamer		117 tons	36.5 m	400			More images...
Lincoln	1886	Balmain paddle steamer		117 tons	36.5 m	400			More images...
Leichhardt	1886	Balmain screw steamer	Leichhardt, an inner west Sydney suburb.	68 tons	23.1 m	370			More images...
Lotus	1886	Cargo vessel 1918-1939		70 tons	22.6 m	268		1918	More images...
Narrabeen (I)	1886	Paddle steamer built by Mort's Docks for Port Jackson Steam Ship Company. Smaller and of lower passenger capacity than Brighton, she was used on off peak services to Manly.In 1911 she was modified for use as a cargo ferry with derricks fitted at either end. Hulked about 1917.	Narrabeen, a coastal northern Sydney suburb and beach.	239 tons	48.8 m		Manly ferry	1917	More images...
Swansea	1887	With Rose, provided the first regular Watson's Bay services.		60 tons		359			
Me Mel	1888	Paddle steamer built for Balmain Steam Ferry Company. On 31 January 1914, sank in four minutes without loss of life after being hit at her wharf by steamer Mokau.	Gadigal word meaning "eye" and name for Goat Island	174 tons	38.1 m	580	paddle steamer		More images...
Bee		Served the Watson's Bay run. Unusually, had a canoe stern. Replaced by ex-Balmain ferry, Bald Rock, and sent to Brisbane.							
Oceana	1886	Served the Watson's Bay run, wrecked on the bar of Manning River while en route to work for Manning River Ferry Company.		34 tons	18.2 m	240		1903	
Jenny Lind		Served the Watson's Bay run for the Watson Bay Regular Steam Ferry Company							
Golden Rose	1872	Served the Watson's Bay run for the Watson Bay Regular Steam Ferry Company. Also served on early Mosman services in 1870s.		12 tons	11.4 m			1891	
Zeus	1878	Served on early Mosman services in 1870s. Wrecked 1892		16 tons, 1898: 35 tons	16.0 m			1892	
Speedwell		Served on early Mosman services in 1870s.							
Matilda		Served on early Mosman services in 1870s.							
Mascotte		Served the Watson's Bay run for the Watson Bay Steam Ferry Company							
Elaine	1882	Served the Watson's Bay run for the Watson Bay Steam Ferry Company.		18 tons	15.4 m	310		1914(?)	
Petrel	1883	Served the Watson's Bay run for the Watson Bay Steam Ferry Company		26 tons, 1898: 35 tons	18.1 m				
Admiral	1883	One of several ferries in the early 1890s, used by the Manly Co-operative Steam Ferry Limited set up to compete, ultimately unsuccessfully, with the Port Jackson Steamship Company.		121 tons	31.1 m			1896, to New Zealand	
Psyche	1884	Served the Watson's Bay run for the Watson Bay Steam Ferry Company		42 tons	21.4 m				
Marra Marra	1884	One of several ferries in the early 1890s, used by the Manly Co-operative Steam Ferry Limited set up to compete, ultimately unsuccessfully, with the Port Jackson Steamship Company.		66 tons	25.3 m			1896, to New Zealand	
Victor		Served the Watson's Bay run for the Watson Bay Regular Steam Ferry Company							
Bald Rock	1884	Wooden paddle steamer. Built in Balmain by G. Duncan for Balmain service. 35 hp steam engine by Atlas Engineering Co. Renamed Vaucluse in September 1900. Later transferred to Watsons Bay service replacing Bee. Name reverted to Bald Rock in 1905. Sold to Melbourne 1907, broken up 1928.	Harbourside inner west Sydney location in Balmain	105 tons	34.3 m		Paddle steamer	1907	More images...
Courier	1887	Served the Watson's Bay and Balmain runs. Contracted to the P & O Line, she was on call whenever one of their liners was in Sydney Harbour		65 tons	22.8 m	300			Courier is on the right. More images...
Genista	1886	Built in Lavender Bay in 1886 by W. Dunn for H. Perdriau was a single-ended vessel used as a ferry, for cruising, and occasional tug work. In 1889, she was sold to Westernport Bay and Flinders Steam Ship Company to work on Westernport Bay. Broken up in 1933.			24.3 m	200		1889 (to Victoria)	
Pheasant	1887	First vessel on Sydney Harbour with triple expansion steam engines. Engines were later used in the Karrabee (1913), and are now part of the Museum of Applied Arts and Sciences collection. Converted to lighter, 1914–1918		138 tons	33.5 m	460		1914(?)	More images...
Birkenhead	1888	Balmain single-ended screw steamer. Had several owners and mostly used around the Balmain-Darling Harbour, Rozelle Bay areas. When the Balmain New Ferry Co. took over the Lane Cove run in 1906 the 'Birkenhead' was also used on that service to Fig Tree. Sank on 14 May 1913.	Harbourside inner west Sydney locality in Drummoyne.	115 tons	26.5 m	440		1913, sank	More images...
Kangaroo (II)	1891	Wooden screw steamer built by David Drake Ltd, Balmain. 60 hp steam engine by Muir & Houston. First double-ended ferry with triple-expansion engines (by Muir & Houston). Burnt out in 1900 and in 1901 and rebuilt each time. Worked on North Sydney service before being transferred to Mosman service. Sold for breaking up 1926.	Australian native animal	158 tons	34.1 m	632	K class	1926	More images...
The Lady Mary	1892	First of several series of 'Lady' ferries. Part of the Balmain New Ferry Company fleet until that company's takeover by Sydney Ferries Ltd in 1918. Sold for £150 to Tay Lighterage Co in 1928 following drop in demand and cut backs to the Balmain service. Became a houseboat after her service as a ferry.		79 tons	25.3 m	393	Lady class, first series	1928	More images...
Lady Napier	1892	Part of the Balmain New Ferry Company fleet until that company's takeover by Sydney Ferries Ltd in 1918.		89 tons	29.9 m	450	Lady class, first series	1920 laid up(?)	
Lady Manning	1893	Part of the Balmain New Ferry Company fleet until that company's takeover by Sydney Ferries Ltd in 1918. Sold for £100 to Tay Lighterage Co in 1928 following drop in demand and cut backs to the Balmain service.		97 tons	33.2 m	475	Lady class, first series	1928	More images...
Conqueror	1893	One of several ferries in the early 1890s, used by the Manly Co-operative Steam Ferry Limited set up to compete, ultimately unsuccessfully, with the Port Jackson Steamship Company. In 1894, collided with smaller ferry, Lily, smashing in 10 feet of Lily's bow and partially sinking her. Conqueror suffered minor damage. Later transferred to South Australia							More images...
Waringa Karaga	1894	Built by Dunn Brothers, Berry's Bay for North Shore Steam ferries costing £3,068 and later taken over by Sydney Ferries Ltd for £2,400. 30 hp compound steam engine by Muir & Houston Ltd, 11 knots. As built had open deck, which was glassed-in about 1910, renamed Karaga in 1913. Cost of additions thought to be £3,131. Around 1919 was in use as the all-night steamer to North Sydney. Taken out of service following opening of Sydney Harbour Bridge. Taken over by Australian government in 1943 for use as accommodation vessel.		125 tons	32.2m	588	K class	1943	More images...
Fearless	1895	Wooden screw steamer, built by Peter Callen of Stockton. 40 hp compound steam engine by Ross & Duncan. 12 knots. Chartered 1896 to the Manly Co-operative Steam Ferry Company as Manly ferry. Alterations carried out by Young, Son & Fletcher of Balmain, and supervised by naval architect Walter Reeks. To Brisbane 1908. Broken up 1952.		104 tons (1896 111 tons)	34.1 m			1932	
Barangaroo	1896	Vehicular paddle ferry. Sank off Terrigal Haven 1933.	Wife of Bennelong, a senior man of the Eora	205 tons	36.4 m	26 vehicles, 86 passengers	Vehicular ferry	1932	More images...
Manly (II)	1896	Wooden screw steamer. Built by Young, Son & Fletcher, Balmain NSW. Designed by renowned naval architect Walter Reeks, the first double-ended screw ferry on the Manly run. In 1922, set a record time of 22 minutes for trip to Manly which has not been beaten by conventional ferry (hydrofoils did the run in 15 minutes). Broken up in 1926.	Manly, a harbourside and coastal northern Sydney suburb and beach	229 tons	44.8 m	820	Manly ferry	1924	More images...
Wallaroo Kiamala	1896	Wooden screw steamer. Built by Young, Son & Fletcher, Rozelle for £5,034. Originally built with open upper deck and sister ship to Carabella. 30 hp triple expansion steam engines by Muir & Houston Ltd. Originally operated by North Shore Steam Ferry Company then by Sydney Ferries Ltd (bought for £3,350). Rebuilt in 1914 by David Drake, Balmain, NSW and glassed-in with named changed to Kiamala for and estimated cost of £1,505. Taken out of service following opening of Sydney Harbour Bridge. Taken over by Australian government in 1943 to assist the war effort as an accommodation vessel. Fate unknown	Wallaroo, Australian native animal.	122 tons	32.4 m	545	K class	1943	More images...
Lady Hampden	1896	Part of the Balmain New Ferry Company fleet until that company's takeover by Sydney Ferries Ltd in 1918. Requisitioned for naval use in 1942. Sunk as target.		135 tons	35.1 m	636	Lady class, first series	1942	More images...
Carabella Karabella	1897	Wooden screw steamer. Sister to Wallaroo/Kiamala. Built by Young, Son & Fletcher, Rozelle for North Shore Steam Ferry Company (later Sydney Ferries Limited) 30 hp compound steam engine by Muir & Houston Ltd. Received electric lighting 1901. Rebuilt, extended, and renamed Karabella in 1916. On 9 May 1901, collided with Rosedale near Milsons Point and damaged amidships. On 17 January 1902, collided with Sonoma and sponson damaged. Taken out of service following opening of Sydney Harbour Bridge in 1932; however, in 1936 returned to service as an excursion vessel mainly following the 18 footer races. Returned to passenger service in 1939 on Neutral Bay route. Taken over by Australian government in 1943 to assist the war effort.	After a house built on North Shore in 1882-'Carrably'	129 t, 1916: 151 t	32 m	595	K class	1943	More images...
Una	1898	Wooden screw steamer, built by WM Ford Jnr, Berrys Bay, 12 hp compound steam engine by Plenty & Sons, 9 knots. Built to replace Nautilus (II) on the Tarban Creek Run. Burnt 4 April 1927	Australian Aboriginal word meaning 'fancy name'	44 tons	20.6 m	180		1927	More images...
Rose	1898	One of Joubert's Lane Cover ferries. Service speed of 10 knots. Designed well for river work with high wheelhouse to see over crowd and a good balance of open and closed areas. Burnt out on 4 April 1927 when Lane Cove service was near its end.		80 tons	25.6 m			1927	More images...
Bronzewing	1899	Wooden screw steamer. The largest of Sydney single-ended ferries, she had a shallow draft and could exceed 12 knots. The last traditional 'river type' boat built for the Parramatta service. Glazed-in all around, and other open ferries were updated to match. Built by R. Young & Son, Balmain for £4,500. 35 hp triple expansion steam engine by Ross & Duncan. 12 knots. Withdrawn from that service in 1931, used by Sydney Ferries Ltd until scrapping in 1933.	A bird	149 tons	33.5 m	500		1933	More images...
Kurraba	1899	Similar to Kirribilli (II). Built by North Shore Steam Ferry Co Ltd. Mainly used on the Mosman run. Laid up 1932, sold for breaking up in 1934.	Kurraba Point, a harbourside northern Sydney suburb.	195 tons	40.9 m	890	K class	1934	More images...
Kirribilli (II)	1900	Wooden screw steamer. Similar to Kurraba. Served various North Shore runs. Retired following opening of the Sydney Harbour Bridge. Broken up 1935.	Kirribilli, a harbourside northern Sydney suburb with an Australian Aboriginal name meaning 'good fishing spot'.	198 tons	39.7 m	896	K class	1934	More images...
Kuring-gai (II)	1901	Designed by renowned naval architect, Walter Reeks. First of the familiar Manly ferry shape of the 20th century. Sold to Newcastle 1928. Tied up and hulked in 1934. In World War II, US forces used her in New Guinea as a storage barge. After WWII, towed back to Newcastle, moored at Hexham and sank in the mud near Hexham Bridge, still visible.	Derived from the Guringai Aboriginal people who were thought to be the traditional owners of the area north of Sydney. More contemporary research suggests that this was not the case.	497 tons	51.8 m	1,228	Manly ferry	1928	More images...
Kamilaroi	1901	Wooden screw steamer, double-ended vehicular ferry. Built by David Drake, Balmain for £10,891. 41 hp compound steam engine by Chapman and Co. Slow vessel (7 knots) due to experimental mounting of engines with pistons running horizontal. Broken up 1932	The Gamilaraay, Australian Aboriginal peoples of inland northern New South Wales and southern Queensland.	328 tons	39.0 m	28 vehicles, 174 passengers.	Vehicular ferry	1932	
Shamrock	1901	Wooden screw steamer. Built by N Joubert. 20 hp compound steam engine by Ross & Duncan. 11 knots. Sold to Newcastle, renamed "Wattle". Broken up by 1941 in Lavender Bay, Sydney.		82 tons	25.2 m	420			More images...
Koree	1902	Built by David Drake, Ltd, Balmain. First Sydney ferry with enclosed promenade deck passenger house. Sold for breaking up in 1934.	An Australian Aboriginal name for Chowder Bay, in the harbourside northern Sydney suburb of Clifton Gardens	276 tons	42.8 m	1,058	K class	1934	More images...
Kailoa	1902	Wooden screw steamer. Built as Greyhound (II) as a tug in 1902 by Allen and Hunter. 33 hp compound steam engine by McKie & Baxter, 12 knots. Bought by Sydney Ferries Limited in 1908 for £6,473 and converted into a ferry to run the Clifton Gardens service. Reconverted to tug in 1917. Broken up 1941.						1941	More images...
King Edward	1902	Served the Watson Bay area until 1934, and set new standards for speed and comfort. Part of the Watsons Bay and South Shore Ferry Company which was bought by Sydney Ferries Ltd in 1920. Sold in 1934 following the cessation of the Vaucluse service in 1933.		98 tons	31.1 m	540		1934	More images...
Kummulla	1903	Built by Dunn Brothers, North Sydney. Collided with Vaucluse in 1919 and was out of service for several weeks for repairs. In 1927, the first vessel to arrive and rescue passengers during the Greycliffe's sinking. Laid up following opening of Sydney Harbour Bridge, 1932. Engine removed 1935 and sold 1935. Hull sold 1939.	Australian Aboriginal word for 'catch me'	168 tons	36.3 m	797	K class	1934	More images...
Lady Rawson	1903	Part of the Balmain New Ferry Company fleet until that company's takeover by Sydney Ferries Ltd in 1918. Differing to the other early Lady Class ferries, had open-air extended shelters for passengers on upper deck. Received significant damage when she collided with the Stephen Street Wharf Balmain on Christmas Eve 1908 and into the recently launched Kuranda (shortly to be renamed Kaludah). Made redundant with the 1932 opening of the Sydney Harbour Bridge.		172		760	Lady class, second series	1934	More images...
Vaucluse (II)	1905	Wooden double-ended screw steamer. Served the Watsons Bay run. The first of the Walter Reeks double-ended single-screw designs and built by Rock Davis of Brisbane Waters. At 15 knots, the fastest ferry at the time. Expensive to run. With the Watsons Bay run declining, the vessel was sold to Newcastle 1931 and its fate is unknown. Watsons Bay service was abandoned in 1933.	Vaucluse, a harbourside eastern Sydney suburb.	121 tons	42.5m	709		1931	More images...
Kulgoa	1905	Built by W M Ford Jnr, North Sydney. Along with Kuramia, at 338 tons, the largest wooden ferries on Sydney Harbour. Built to service the busy North Shore routes. In 1935, provided with a higher (flying) bridge for use as a spectator vessel for sailing events. Sold for breaking up 1952 following State Government takeover.	Australian Aboriginal word meaning 'returning'	338 tons	42.7 m	1,255	K class	1952	More images...
Binngarra	1905	Designed by Captain Christie and built by Morts Dock & Engineering. First of the Binngarra class Manly ferry that was the model for the Manly ferry throughout the 20th century. The first of six near identical sister ships Bellubera and Barrenjoey (later North Head). Converted to lighter 1933 and used in Port Stephens. Hull later used in New Guinea by United States Navy during World War II. Scuttled 1946	Australian Aboriginal word meaning 'returning'	442 tons	57.9 m	1372 (summer) / 858 (winter)	Manly ferry, Binngarra type	1933	More images...
Lady Northcote	1905	Part of the Balmain New Ferry Company fleet until that company's takeover by Sydney Ferries Ltd in 1918. First double-ended screw ferry in Sydney built for single-screw propulsion. Converted to diesel power in the 1930s. Similar to Lady Rawson but with raised wheelhouses. Along with Lady Rawson, was the largest of the series and sported two funnels. Sold and hulked 1941. Scuttled in Pittwater 1945	Wife of Henry Northcote, 1st Baron Northcote	128 tons	35.3 m	605	Lady class, second series	1941	More images...
Kareela	1905	Built for Neutral Bay to Circular Quay Service by Morrison & Sinclair Ltd, Balmain. Nicknamed 'The Box'. Sold for breaking up in 1959 after Kosciusko returned to service following her conversion to diesel power.	Australian Aboriginal word for 'south wind'	106 tons	34.4 m	784	K class	1959	More images...
Lady Linda	1906	Part of the Balmain New Ferry Company fleet until that company's takeover by Sydney Ferries Ltd in 1918. Was used more as a picnic boat than a ferry and ended her career as a small tug.		13 tons	13.1 m			1934	More images...
Kaikai	1906	Built by David Drake Ltd, Balmain for £13,575. Triple expansion steam engine (59 hp). When launched (7 November 1906 by Miss Nina Massic), she was the largest of the Sydney Ferries Ltd fleet. Reached 11.5 knots on her trials (13 March 1907), and three days later began work on the heavy-lift commuter run from Circular Quay to Lavender Bay. Survived opening of harbour bridge in 1932 and was modified with a flying bridge to provide her master with greater visibility in order to follow yacht races. She was used extensively for charter and concert events. To Navy 1942 for use as accommodation ship. Navy purchased her in 1943. Sold for breaking up 1947; O/N 121166	Australian Aboriginal word for 'jewfish' or 'food'	303 tons	46.3 m	1245	K class	1942	More images...
Ben Bolt	1907	Wooden screw steamer, built by George Whatmore, Bellinger River. Engine by Perdriau & West. 15 hp compound surface condensing steam engine. Later used as company cargo lighter by PJMS (1912–1923), then Harbour Land and Transport Co Ltd (1923–1932) Register closed 1932, fate unknown.		83 tons	27.9 m			1932	
Kookooburra	1907	Represented Sydney Ferries Limited's first attempt to design ferry specifically for Parramatta River service after it took over the service in 1901. Unusually for K class, it was originally fitted with a short funnel for service along the river and its low bridges. Kaludah was smaller, but otherwise of similar design. Following cessation of services past Gladesville Bridge in 1928, she was fitted with tall funnel. In late 1940s, was sent to Newcastle to carry dockyard workers. Broken up in 1959.	Australian native bird	180 tons	42.7 m	700	K class	1948-49(?)	More images...
Burra-bra	1908	Second of the Binngarra class Manly ferry. Almost identical sister ship to Binngarra (1905), Bellubera (1910), Balgowlah (1912), Barrenjoey (1913 – later North Head, and Baragoola. Sold to Navy in 1942. Broken up c. 1950.	An Australian Aboriginal name for The Spit, a harbourside northern Sydney locality in Mosman.	458 tons	59.4 m	1437 (summer) / 916 (winter)	Manly ferry, Binngarra type	1942	More images...
Lady Carrington	1908	Part of the Balmain New Ferry Company fleet until that company's takeover by Sydney Ferries Ltd in 1918. Sold for breaking up 1934.		146 tons	39.6 m	701	Lady class, second series	1934	More images...
Killara (II)	1909	Wooden screw ferry, double-ended vehicular ferry. Built by David Drake, cost £15,561. 56 hp triple expansion steam engine by Mort's Dock & Engineering, 10 knots. sold for service on Westernport Bay in 1933 following the opening of the Sydney Harbour Bridge. Sold to Melbourne authorities 1944. Later broken up in Tasmania. Similar to Kedumba.	Killara, a northern Sydney suburb.	309 tons	40.0	49 passengers, 33 vehicles	Vehicular ferry	1933	More images...
Kaludah, formerly Kuranda	1909	Built by Morrison & Sinclair Ltd. Balmain. Campbell & Calderwood triple expansion steam engines (50 hp, 12 knots). Launched as Kuranda but named changed to Kaludah when larger ship was named Kuranda. Of similar design to Kookooburra with short funnel to pass under low bridges on Parramatta River service. Kookooburra and Kaludah were the only K-class ferries to have pointed rather than rounded ends. Gutted by fire and sank in 1911....the shortest lived of the Sydney ferries. Engines and usable timber went to the Kamiri.		137 tons	35.1 m		K class	1911	More images...
Kanimbla (later Kurra-Ba)	1910	Similar to Kosciusko. Built by Morrison & Sinclair Ltd, Balmain. collided with Manly ferry Balgowlah tearing a hole in the Kanimbla's port bow. Balgowlah had minor damage whereas Kanimbla nearly sank. Gave up her original name, Kanimbla, in 1935 to a bigger ship, and became Kurra-Ba. Broken up 1950s.	Australian Aboriginal word for 'Big fight'	156 tons	35.4 m	791	K class	1946(?)	More images
Bellubera	1910	Third of the Binngarra class Manly ferry. Almost identical sister ship to Binngarra (1905), Burra-bra (1908), Balgowlah (1912), Barrenjoey (1913 – later North Head, and Baragoola. 1936, first Australian ship to be converted to diesel-electric engines with Harland and Woolf engines. Fire destroyed her superstructure while tied up overnight with the death of 2 crewman. Rebuilt in 1937. 1954 updated with English Electric units. Retired 1973, scuttled off Long Reef 1980.	Thought to be an Australian Aboriginal word for "pretty lady" or "beautiful woman".	499 tons (1936: 505 tons)	64.0 m	1,490 (summer)/962 (winter). (1936: 1,318)	Manly ferry, Binngarra type	1973	In her final configuration as a diesel-electric vessel. (More images)
Kangoola	1910	Steel screw steamer. O/N: 125238. Built by G Cromack, Sydney, £3,753. Sydney Ferries Limited lighter and tug. Register closed 1932.		88 tons	34.2 m			c. 1932	
Kirrule	1910	Identical sister to Kiandra & Kubu and otherwise similar to steel-hulled Kirawa and Kanangra. All three vessels survived the opening of the Sydney Harbour Bridge, but Kirrule and Kiandra were laid up following State Government takeover of Sydney Ferries Ltd in 1951. She was considered for conversion to diesel; however, she was broken up in 1953. More images	Australian Aboriginal word for 'aroused'	258 tons	42.7 m	1100	K class	1951	More images...
Lady Chelmsford	1910	Built by Brisbane Water shipbuilder Rock Davis. Similar to Lady Edeline, Lady Denman, Lady Scott, and Lady Ferguson. Part of the Balmain New Ferry Company fleet until that company's takeover by Sydney Ferries Ltd in 1918. In 1933, became first Sydney Ferries Ltd vessel to be converted to diesel. Gardner diesel, two strike five-cylinder providing 190 hp (141 kW) and 10.3 knots. Sent to Adelaide in 1971 and rebuilt as show boat. In 1985 moved to Melbourne where she sank in 2008 and was broken up in 2011.	Wife of Governor of NSW, Frederic Thesiger, 1st Viscount Chelmsford				Lady class, third series	1971	More images...
Kiandra	1911	Built by Morrison & Sinclair Ltd, Balmain. Identical sister to Kirrule & Kubu. During the 1920s, Kiandra and her two sisters were used for harbour cruises and proved popular in this role. Laid up immediately following State Government takeover of Sydney Ferries Ltd in 1951. Sold for breaking up 1953	A corruption of Aboriginal 'Gianderra' for 'sharp stones for knives' and town in NSW	258 tons	42.7 m	1,101	K class	1951	More images...
Greycliffe	1911	Served the Watson's Bay run. Part of the Watsons Bay and South Shore Ferry Company which was bought by Sydney Ferries Ltd in 1920. In 1927, sunk in collision with liner Tahiti with the loss of 40 lives.		133 tons	38.1 m			1927	More images...
Kosciusko	1911	Similar to Kanimbla. Built by David Drake Ltd., Balmain. Converted to diesel in 1959. In 1975, towed to Hobart following collapse of bridge and sold to that city. Following re-opening of the bridge, she was sold and used as a floating restaurant, but burnt out during renovations in 1982. End of hull, including propeller and rudder, displayed outside hotel in Hobart.	Australian mountain named after Polish military leader Tadeusz Kościuszko	165 tons	35.4 m	792	K class	1975	More images...
Balgowlah	1912	Fourth of the Binngarra class Manly ferry. Steel double-ended screw steamer. Sister ship to Bellubera (1910), Barrenjoey (1913 – later North Head and similar to Binngarra (1905), Burra-bra (1908), and Baragoola (1922). Built by Mort's Dock & Engineering. 122 hp triple expansion steam engine by builder. 16 knots. Hulked 1953	Balgowlah, a harbourside northern Sydney suburb.	499 tons	64.0 m	1517 (summer) / 982 (winter)	Manly ferry, Binngarra type	1953	More images...
Kanangra	1912	Sister ship to Kirawa who were the first steel-hull K Class vessels. Built by Mort's Dock & Engineering Co. Ltd, Balmain. The last of the inner-harbour ferries to be converted to diesel re-entering service in 1959. Retired 1985. Now part of Sydney Heritage Fleet and under restoration. One of the longest serving Sydney ferries and the last of the large early twentieth century Sydney ferries.	Australian Aboriginal word for 'beautiful view'	295 tons	50 m	1000	K class	1985	More images...
Kirawa	1912	Sister ship to Kanangra who were the first steel-hull K Class vessels. Built by Mort's Dock & Engineering Co Ltd, Balmain. Retired and broken up in 1953 due to faulty boiler tubes.	Australian Aboriginal word for 'looking for them'	-	50 m	1000	K class	1953	More images...
Kubu	1912	Identical sister to Kiandra & Kirrule. Built by Morrison & Sinclair Ltd, Balmain. Along with her sisters, she was given greater power than earlier vessels of the same size so that longer runs to Mosman were quicker. Used in the 1920s as an excursion vessel. Removed from service following Kanangra's return to service after conversion to diesel. The last coal-fired steam ferry on Port Jackson. Laid up in 1959.	Australian Aboriginal word for 'oak tree'	258 tons	42.7 m	1072	K class	1959	More images...
Kamiri	1912	Sister to Kameruka. Built by Morrison & Sinclair Ltd, Balmain. Used engines and timbers of Kaludah which was gutted by fire in 1912. Retired in 1951 and broken up upon state government takeover of Sydney Ferries Ltd.	Name of Aboriginal Australian tribe	144 tons	34.1 m	594	K class	1951	More images...
Lady Denman	1912	Built by J Dent of Jervis Bay. Similar to Lady Edeline, Lady Chelmsford, Lady Scott, and Lady Ferguson. Part of the Balmain New Ferry Company fleet until that company's takeover by Sydney Ferries Ltd in 1918. Converted to diesel power in the 1930s. Now part of museum on NSW South Coast.	Gertrude Denman, wife of fifth Governor-General of Australia	96 tons	33.5 m	500	Lady class, third series		More images...
Antarctic	1913	Wooden screw steamer built by J Dent of Jervis Bay for Harbour Land and Transport Company. 17 hp compound steam engine by McKie & Baxter, 11 knots. Fate unknown		33 tons	19.1 m				
Barrenjoey, later North Head	1913	Fifth of the Binngarra class Manly ferry. Almost identical sister ship to Binngarra (1905), Burra-bra (1908), Bellubera (1910), Balgowlah (1912), and Baragoola (1922). Converted to diesel electric in 1951, and renamed North Head – significantly modified in appearance with two short funnels, enclosed top deck and new hull shape.	Barrenjoey headland in the northern Sydney suburb of Palm Beach and Aboriginal word for wallaby. North Head at entrance to Sydney Harbour.	500 tons, 1954: 466 tons	64.0 m	1509, 1951: 1278	Manly ferry, Binngarra type	1985	Barrenjoey images...North Head images...
Kameruka	1913	Sister to Kamiri. Built by Morrison & Sinclair Ltd, Balmain for Parramatta River run. Relatively high speed ferry, and thus used on Taronga Zoo and river runs. Burnt out in 1918 and rebuilt. 1938 boiler crowns collapsed and was not returned to work until 1945. In 1954 was converted to diesel and given a more modern-looking makeover. One of the longest-lived Sydney Harbour ferries.	Australian Aboriginal word meaning 'wait til I come'	144 tons	34.1 m	594	K class	1984(?)	More images...
Lady Edeline	1913	Built by J Watson of Annandale. Similar to Lady Denman, Lady Chelmsford, Lady Scott, and Lady Ferguson. Part of the Balmain New Ferry Company fleet until that company's takeover by Sydney Ferries Ltd in 1918. Converted to diesel power in the 1936. Re-engined 1963. Laid up 1984, sank near Mortlake Punt 1988.		96 tons	33.7 m	544	Lady class, third series	1984	More images...
Karrabee	1913	Sister to Karingal. Built by Morrison & Sinclair Ltd. Original triple expansion steam engines (36 hp, Hawthorn, Leslie & Co.) were sourced from Pheasant (1887), Sydney's first triple-expansion steam ferry. These engines are now part of the Museum of Applied Arts and Sciences collection. 1936 converted from steam to diesel-electric power (6-cylinder diesel, by Henty & Gardner), the first of the Sydney Ferries Ltd fleet converted. Re-engined 1958. 1984 sank at Circular Quay after competing in the annual Great Ferry Race. Raised two days later and laid up. 1986 sold and relocated to Gosford as floating restaurant. Sank at wharf in 2003 and broken up in 2005.	Australian Aboriginal word for 'cockatoo'	107 tons	32.8 m	653	K class	1984	More images...
Karingal	1913	Sister to Karrabee. Built by Morrison & Sinclair Ltd, Balmain. Her original steam engines came from Alathea when she was converted to a lighter. Converted to diesel in 1937. Re-engined 1961. Sank in Bass Strait en route to new owners in Melbourne in the mid-1980s.	Australian Aboriginal word meaning 'happy home'	107 tons	31.7 m	608	K class	1984(?)	More images...
Woollahra	1913	Built for Watsons Bay-Manly service and uniquely had high wheelhouses and bulwarks to run across Sydney Heads, but the service was short lived. Part of the Watsons Bay and South Shore Ferry Company which was bought by Sydney Ferries Ltd in 1920. Used on other services after Vaucluse service was abandoned in 1933 due to competition from trams and private cars. Sold 1941.	Woollahra, an eastern Sydney suburb and Australian Aboriginal word meaning 'camp', 'meeting ground' or a 'sitting down place'.	152 tons	38.1 m			1941	
Kuramia	1914	Along with Kulgoa, at 335 tons, the largest wooden ferries on Sydney Harbour. Built by David Drake Ltd, Balmain. Engine sold 1940, requisitioned for naval use in 1942 as a boom gate vessel on the harbour boom off Watsons Bay. Hulk sunk as target of Sydney, 10 October 1953.		335 tons	47.7 m	1357	K class		More images...
Kedumba	1914	Vehicular ferry, similar to Killara (II). On 24 September 1916, used to transport Jessi the elephant across the harbour to the new Taronga Zoo. Redundant with the opening of the Sydney Harbour Bridge, she sank off Narooma in January 1933 whilst being towed to Victoria.	Australian Aboriginal word for 'falling water'	294 tons	40.1 m		Vehicular ferry		
Lady Scott	1914	Wooden screw steamer. Built by J Dent of Jervis Bay. Similar to Lady Edeline, Lady Chelmsford, Lady Denman, and Lady Ferguson. Part of the Balmain New Ferry Company fleet until that company's takeover by Sydney Ferries Ltd in 1918. Converted to diesel power in the 1930s. Sold in 1969 and converted to a cruise ferry. Caught fire and burnt to the waterline in 1972. Superstructure was rebuilt on hull with new appearance as the successful John Cadman cruising restaurant. Sold 2000s renamed Harbour Queen. Sank at Blackwattle Bay 2014 and broken up		95 tons	33.5 m	486	Lady class, third series	1969	More images...
Lady Ferguson	1914	Similar to Lady Edeline, Lady Chelmsford, Lady Scott, and Lady Denman. Part of the Balmain New Ferry Company fleet until that company's takeover by Sydney Ferries Ltd in 1918. Converted to diesel power in the 1930s. Re-engined 1956. Acting as a relief ferry since 1963, she was to set aside for disposal in 1974. Towed to Hobart in March 1975 as relief vessel after bridge collapse but could not be used due to poor condition. Broken up 1977.	Lady Helen Hermione, wife of Ronald Munro Ferguson, 1st Viscount Novar	96 tons	33.5 m	490	Lady class, third series	1975	More images...
Kurnell, formerly Romantic	1916	Built for Cockatoo Island Dockyard run, 1924 sold to Sydney Ferries Ltd, 1925 to Newcastle, 1939 to Hegarty's ferries. Broken up 1974.	Kurnell, a bayside and coastal southern Sydney suburb.				K class	1942	
Kooroongaba	1921	Vehicular ferry. Following opening of Sydney Harbour Bridge in 1932, used on the Hunter River between Newcastle and Stockton. Sank en route to Philippines 1972.	Australian Aboriginal word for 'pelican'	313 tons	41.8 m	45 vehicles, 220 passengers	Vehicular ferry	1932	More images...
Narrabeen (II)	1921	The last Manly cargo ferry. Nicknamed "The Broad Bean". Sold in 1928 to Westernport Bay Shipping Company when Manly cargo service closed down. Wrecked in 1958.	Narrabeen, a coastal northern Sydney suburb and beach	235 tons			Cargo ferry	1928 sold to Victoria, 1958 wrecked	More images...
Baragoola	1922	Steel screw steamer (later diesel). Sixth and final of the Binngarra class Manly ferry. Built by Morts Dock & Engineering. Converted to diesel electric in 1961. Decommissioned 1983 and laid up. Sank at her moorings at Balls Head, 2023.	Australian Aboriginal word for "flood tide"	498 tons	60.7 m	1523	Manly ferry, Binngarra type	1983	More images...
Kuttabul	1922	Along with her sister, Koompartoo, they were the last of the K-class ferries and the two largest ferries ever owned by Sydney Ferries Ltd. Built by NSW Government Dockyard, Newcastle. Passenger capacity larger than any Sydney ferry, including Manly ferries, both vessels built for the short heavy lift run from Circular Quay to Milsons Point. Originally certified for 1,505 passengers, they later carried up to 2,500 passengers, and regularly 2,000. Removed from service following opening of the Sydney Harbour Bridge. Later used for cruises and to view harbour sailing events. Taken over by the Royal Australian Navy as an accommodation ship and moored at Garden Island where, on 31 May 1942, sunk by Japanese torpedo with the loss of nineteen naval ratings (see Attack on Sydney Harbour). Naval base at Garden Island carries the name HMAS Kuttabul	Australian Aboriginal word for 'wonderful'	447 tons	55.7 m	2089	K class	1932	More images...
Koompartoo	1922	Built by NSW Government Dockyard, Newcastle. Along with sister Kuttabul, were the two biggest ferries ever owned by Sydney Ferries and the largest ferry on Sydney Harbour by passenger capacity. Both vessels built for the short heavy lift run from Circular Quay to Milsons Point. Made redundant on the Milsons Point run following 1932 opening of the Sydney Harbour Bridge and converted to concert boat in 1935. Converted to Naval boom-gate vessel 1942–42. Sold to Commonwealth Government 1945. Stripped hull went to Tasmania 1966 to be used as a bauxite barge.	Australian Aboriginal word meaning 'a fresh start'	447 tons	55.7 m	2089	K class	1932(?)	More images...
Koondooloo	1924	Originally built as a vehicular punt, in 1937, following redundancy with the opening of the harbour bridge, she was converted to be Sydney's first specially built showboat. A second deck was later added. In September 1942, she was converted to Army repair craft S181 Koondooloo adding workshops and gun sponsons. Later, reconverted to a vehicular ferry. Wrecked at Trial Bay in 1972 while under tow.	Australian Aboriginal word for 'emu'	350 tons	58.5 m	56 vehicles, 292 passengers	Vehicular ferry		More images...
Kalang, later Sydney Queen	1926	Steel steam screw vehicular ferry. Sister to Kara Kara and similar to Koondooloo and the biggest car ferries to operate in Sydney. Built by J Chrichton & Co Ltd (Saltney, England. 148 hp triple expansion steam engine by Plenty & Sons Ltd. 13 knots. Made redundant with opening of Sydney Harbour Bridge. Used as cargo vessel 1932–1938. Converted to a three-deck showboat 1938. In World War 2, converted to AEME floating workshop (repair ship) Kalang AB97. Steamed up Australian east coast and across to Samarai. Operated as repair ship in Rabaul and Torokina. Converted back to show boat in 1947/48. Not included in the 1951 government takeover of Sydney Ferries and continued to operate as a showboat. Laid up in 1958. Renamed Sydney Queen in 1960 by new owners and painted white. Laid up in 1963. Wrecked at Trial Bay in 1972 while under tow to Manilla for use as a ferry/showboat.	Australian Aboriginal word meaning 'beautiful'	350	57.0 m	50 vehicles, 250 passengers. 2,153 passengers as showboat	Vehicular ferry		More images...
Kara Kara	1926	Vehicular ferry	Australian Aboriginal word for the moon	350	57.0 m		Vehicular ferry		More images...
Estelle, later Estelle Star	1927	Wooden motor vessel built for N D Hegarty & Sons by G E Beattie, Woy Woy. 120 bhp diesel by Atlas Imperial Co, 8 knots. Built with open upper deck, enclosed prior to 1935. Transferred to Victoria (1948?). Converted to tuna trawler. burnt out and/or sank 1976 or 1978		85 tons	24.4 m	400			More images...
Curl Curl	1928	Along with Dee Why, one of two identical sister ships built for the Manly run. When introduced, the largest ferries on Sydney Harbour. Capable of 20 knots, possibly the fastest displacement hull ferry on Sydney Harbour. Laid up 1960, scuttled 1969.	Curl Curl, a coastal northern Sydney suburb and beach	790 tons	67.1 m	1574 (summer) / 1235 (winter)	Manly ferry, Dee Why type	1960	More images...
Dee Why	1928	Along with Curl Curl, one of two identical sister ships built for the Manly run. When introduced, the largest ferries on Sydney Harbour. Laid up 1968, scuttled 1976.	Dee Why, a coastal northern Sydney suburb and beach	790 tons	67.1 m	1574 (summer) / 1235 (winter)	Manly ferry, Dee Why type	1968	More images...
Clifton	1934	Experimental ferry							More images...
South Steyne	1938	The largest and last steam ferry to operate on Sydney Harbour. Built for the Manly run, she served until 1974. Damaged by fire 1974 while laid up, restored in the 1980s, used as a floating restaurant. Remains in existence and arguably the most famous of all Sydney ferries.	The southern promenade of Manly Beach	1203 tons	66.1 m	1781	Manly ferry	1974	More images...
Rodney Regalia	1938	Capsized on 13 February 1938 due to overloading of the top deck with the loss of 19 lives. Re-floated and renamed Regalia.							More images...
Kooleen	1956	New style, fully enclosed ferry. Originally intended to be the first of a series, she was immediately unpopular with passengers (but popular with masters) and no more were built.		67 tons	22.7 m	278		1985	More images...
Manly (III)	1964	Japanese built. The first hydrofoil service on Sydney Harbour.	Manly, a harbourside and coastal northern Sydney suburb and beach	31 tons	20.7 m	72	Hydrofoil		More images...
Fairlight (II)	1966	Hydrofoil on Manly service	Fairlight, a harbourside northern Sydney suburb and beach	65 tons	29.0 m	140	Hydrofoil	1984	
Lady Cutler	1968	First of new generation of double-ended ferries. Followed two years later by the similar Lady Woodward and Lady Mckell.	Helen Cutler, wife of Roden Cutler, Governor of NSW	404 tons	36.2 m	570	Lady-class ferry	1991	More images...
Palm Beach	1969	Hydrofoil on Manly service	Palm Beach, a coastal northern Sydney suburb and beach	65 tons	29.0 m	140	Hydrofoil		More images...
Lady Woodward	1970	Identical sister to Lady Mckell and near identical sister to Lady Cutler	Wife of Eric Woodward Governor of NSW	339 tons	36.2 m	570	Lady-class ferry		More images...
Lady Mckell	1970	Identical sister to Lady Woodward and near identical sister to Lady Cutler		339 tons	36.2 m	570	Lady-class ferry		More images...
Dee Why (II)	1970	Hydrofoil on Manly service	Dee Why, a coastal northern Sydney suburb.	65 tons	29.0 m	140	Hydrofoil	1985	More images...
Curl Curl (II)	1973	Hydrofoil on Manly service	Curl Curl, a coastal northern Sydney suburb.	65 tons	29.0 m	140	Hydrofoil		More images...
Lady Wakehurst	1974	Sister to Lady Northcott. Sent to Hobart to assist following 1975 Bridge collapse. Returned 1977. Used on Manly run in 1970s and 1980s until new Freshwater-class ferries commissioned.	Wife of John Loder, 2nd Baron Wakehurst, former Governor of NSW	366 tons	38.9 m	820	Lady-class ferry		In her original Public Transport Commission colours (More images...)
Lady Northcott	1974(?)	Sister to Lady Wakehurst	Wife of John Northcott former Governor of NSW	366 tons	38.9 m	820	Lady-class ferry	2017	More images...
Lady Street	1979	Sister to Lady Herron		350 tons	35.3 m	554	Lady-class ferry	2002(?)	More images...
Lady Herron	1979	Sister to Lady Street	Wife of Leslie Herron, Lieutenant Governor General of NSW	350 tons	35.3 m	554	Lady-class ferry	2017	More images...
Freshwater	1982	First of new class of Manly ferry	Freshwater Beach, a coastal northern Sydney beach.	1150 tons	70.4 m	1100	Freshwater class	In service	More images...
Queenscliff	1983	Second of Freshwater class Manly ferry	Queenscliff, a coastal northern Sydney suburb and beach	1140 tons	70.4 m	1150	Freshwater class	In service	More images...
Narrabeen (III)	1984	Third of original order of Freshwater class Manly ferry	Narrabeen, a coastal northern Sydney suburb and beach	1150 tons	70.4 m	1100	Freshwater class	In Service	More images...
Sirius	1984	First of nine "First Fleet-class" catamaran ferries. Each of the class underwent a major upgrade in 2020/21/22.	HMS Sirius, flagship of the 1787 First Fleet.	105 tons	25.4 m	393	First Fleet	In service	More images...
Manly (IV)	1984	First of two 235-seat hydrofoils to enter service on the Harbour	Manly, a harbourside and coastal northern Sydney suburb and beach	105 tons	31.2 m	235	Hydrofoil	1991	More images...
Sydney	1985	Second of two 235-seat hydrofoils to enter service on the Harbour	The city of Sydney	105 tons	31.2 m	235	Hydrofoil	1991	More images...
Supply	1985	One of nine "First Fleet-class" catamaran ferries. Each of the class underwent a major upgrade in 2020/21/22.	HMS Supply, part of the 1787 First Fleet	105 tons	25.4 m	393	First Fleet	In service	More images...
Alexander	1985	One of nine "First Fleet-class" catamaran ferries. Each of the class underwent a major upgrade in 2020/21/22.	Alexander, part of the 1787 First Fleet	105 tons	25.4 m	393	First Fleet	In service	More images...
Borrowdale	1985	One of nine "First Fleet-class" catamaran ferries. Each of the class underwent a major upgrade in 2020/21/22.	Borrowdale, part of the 1787 First Fleet.	105 tons	25.4 m	393	First Fleet	In service	More images...
Charlotte	1985	One of nine "First Fleet-class" catamaran ferries. Each of the class underwent a major upgrade in 2020/21/22.	Charlotte, part of the 1787 First Fleet.	105 tons	25.4 m	393	First Fleet	In service	More images...
Fishburn	1985	One of nine "First Fleet-class" catamaran ferries. Each of the class underwent a major upgrade in 2020/21/22.	Fishburn, part of the 1787 First Fleet.	105 tons	25.4 m	403	First Fleet	In service	More images...
Friendship	1986	One of nine "First Fleet-class" catamaran ferries. Each of the class underwent a major upgrade in 2020/21/22.	Friendship, part of the 1787 First Fleet.	105 tons	25.4 m	403	First Fleet	In service	More images...
Golden Grove	1986	One of nine "First Fleet-class" catamaran ferries. Each of the class underwent a major upgrade in 2020/21/22.	Golden Grove, part of the 1787 First Fleet.	105 tons	25.4 m	403	First Fleet	In service	More images...
Scarborough	1986	One of nine "First Fleet-class" catamaran ferries. Each of the class underwent a major upgrade in 2020/21/22.	Scarborough, part of the 1787 First Fleet.	105 tons	25.4 m	403	First Fleet	In service	More images...
Collaroy	1988	Fourth and final of Freshwater class ferry. First of her class to have open ends on upper deck. Preceding three Freshwater class ferries subsequently have the open upper deck retro-fitted.	Collaroy, a coastal northern Sydney suburb and beach	1140 tons	70.4 m	1150	Freshwater class	2023	More images...
Betty Cuthbert	1992		Athlete Betty Cuthbert	41 tons	36.8 m	230	RiverCat	2023	More images...
Dawn Fraser	1992		Swimmer Dawn Fraser	41 tons	36.8 m	230	RiverCat	2026	More images...
Evonne Goolagong	1993		Evonne Goolagong	41 tons	36.8 m	230	RiverCat	2024	More images...
Marlene Mathews	1993		Marlene Matthews	41 tons	36.8 m	230	RiverCat	2025	More images...
Marjorie Jackson	1993		Marjorie Jackson	41 tons	36.8 m	230	RiverCat	2025	More images...
Shane Gould	1993		Shane Gould	41 tons	36.8 m	230	RiverCat	2025	More images...
Nicole Livingstone	1995		Nicole Livingstone	41 tons	36.8 m	230	RiverCat	2024	More images...
Anne Sargeant	1998		Netballer Anne Sargeant	35 tons	29.6 m	150	HarbourCat	2022	More images...
Pam Burridge	1998		Surfer Pam Burridge	35 tons	29.6 m	150	HarbourCat	2023	More images...
Louise Sauvage	2001		Paralympian Louise Sauvage	48 tons	37.8 m	250	SuperCat	2024	More images...
Saint Mary MacKillop	2001		Australia's first declared saint Mary MacKillop	48 tons	37.8 m	250	SuperCat	2021	More images...
Susie O’Neill	2001		Swimmer Susie O'Neill	48 tons	37.8 m	250	SuperCat	2022	More images...
SuperCat 4	2001		-	48 tons	37.8 m	250	SuperCat	2024	More images...
Fred Hollows	2017		Ophthalmologist Fred Hollows	40 tons	36.4 m	400	Emerald class	In service	
Victor Chang	2017		Cardiac surgeon Victor Chang	40 tons	36.4 m	400	Emerald class	In service	
Pemulwuy	2017		Aboriginal leader Pemulwuy	40 tons	36.4 m	400	Emerald class	In service	
Bungaree (II)	2017		Aboriginal early colonial era explorer, entertainer & community leader Bungaree	40 tons	36.4 m	400	Emerald class	In service	
May Gibbs (formerly Ferry McFerryface)	2017		Children's author May Gibbs	40 tons	36.4 m	400	Emerald class	In service	
Catherine Hamlin	2017		Obstetrician and gynaecologist Catherine Hamlin	40 tons	36.4 m	400	Emerald class	In service	
Me-Mel (II)	2019		Gadigal word meaning "eye" and name for Goat Island		12 m	43	MiniCat	In service	More images...
Balmoral	2021		Balmoral Beach, a harbourside northern Sydney beach in Mosman				Emerald class	In service	
Clontarf	2021		Clontarf, a harbourside northern Sydney suburb and beach				Emerald class	In service	
Fairlight (III)	2021		Fairlight, a harbourside northern Sydney suburb and beach				Emerald class	In service	
Ruby Langford Ginibi	2021		Bundjalung author and historian Ruby Langford Ginibi	17.5 tons	24 m	200	River-class	In service	
Esme Timbery	2021		Bidjigal artist Esme Timbery	17.5 tons	24 m	200	River-class	In service	
Margaret Olley	2021		Painter Margaret Olley	17.5 tons	24 m	200	River-class	In service	
Olive Cotton	2021		Photographer Olive Cotton	17.5 tons	24 m	200	River-class	In service	
Ruth Park	2021		Author Ruth Park	17.5 tons	24 m	200	River-class	In service	
Ethel Turner	2021		Author Ethel Turner	17.5 tons	24 m	200	River-class	In service	
Cheryl Salisbury	2021		Football player Cheryl Salisbury	17.5 tons	24 m	200	River-class	In service	
Liz Ellis	2021		Netball player Liz Ellis	17.5 tons	24 m	200	River-class	In service	
Lauren Jackson	2021		Basketball player Lauren Jackson	17.5 tons	24 m	200	River-class	In service	
Kurt Fearnley	2021		Wheelchair racer Kurt Fearnley	17.5 tons	24 m	200	River-class	In service	
Frances Bodkin	2024		Dharawal elder and botanist Frances Bodkin		24 m	200	Parramatta River-class	In service	
John Nutt	2024		Engineer John Nutt		24 m	200	Parramatta River-class	In service	
Isobel Bennett	2024		Biologist Isobel Bennett		24 m	200	Parramatta River-class	In service	
Martin Green	2024		Engineer and professor Martin Green		24 m	200	Parramatta River-class	In Service	
Ruby Payne Scott	2025		Pioneer in Radiophysics and Radio astronomy Ruby Payne-Scott		24m	200	Parramatta River-class	In service	
Norman Selfe	2025		Civil Engineer Norman Selfe		24m	200	Parramatta River-class	In service	
Jack Mundey	2025		communist, trade unionist and environmental activist. Jack Mundey		24m	200	Parramatta River-class	In service	

== See also ==
- Timeline of Sydney Harbour ferries
