= List of Hobart ferries =

This is a list of ferries that service (either currently or previously) the River Derwent and surrounds (such as the Huon River, Tasman Peninsula, and D'Entrecasteaux Channel around the Australian city of Hobart in the Australian island state of Tasmania.

Current

Name	Year built	Builder	Initial ownership	Current ownership / fate	Max. passengers
MV Excella (Peppermint Bay I / MR0)	2001	Richardson Devine Marine	Navigators	Derwent Ferries	80
Ena (MR1 (Mona Roma))	2015	Incat	Mona	Mona	251
Freya (MR2)	2018	Richardson Devine Marine	Mona	Mona	
Peppermint Bay II	2003	Richardson Devine Marine	Gordon River Cruises	Peppermint Bay Cruises	167
Spirit of Hobart previously Southern Cross	1982		Hobart Historic Cruises	Hobart Historic Cruises	150
ML Egeria (briefly HMAS TASMA)	1941	Purdon and Featherstone	Marine Board of Hobart	Motor Yacht Club of Tasmania	
MV Cuttlefish	2020	Richardson Devine Marine	Cuttlefish Cruises	Cuttlefish Cruises	
MV Nairana (MV Bruny Island Ferry#1)	2019	Richardson Devine Marine	SeaLink Travel Group	SeaLink Travel Group	36 vehicles
MV Parrabah (MV Bruny Island Ferry#2)	2020	Richardson Devine Marine	SeaLink Travel Group	SeaLink Travel Group	36 vehicles
MV Marana	2002	Richardson Devine Marine	Navigators	Port Arthur Historic Site	
Wild Thing		Kirby Marine	Pennicott Wilderness Cruises	Bruny Island Cruises and Tasman Island Cruises	43
The Shearwater		Kirby Marine	Pennicott Wilderness Cruises	Bruny Island Cruises and Tasman Island Cruises	43
Silver Gull		Kirby Marine	Pennicott Wilderness Cruises	Bruny Island Cruises and Tasman Island Cruises	43
Albatross		Kirby Marine	Pennicott Wilderness Cruises	Bruny Island Cruises and Tasman Island Cruises	43
Storm Petrel		Kirby Marine	Pennicott Wilderness Cruises	Bruny Island Cruises and Tasman Island Cruises	43
		Kirby Marine	Pennicott Wilderness Cruises	Bruny Island Cruises and Tasman Island Cruises	43
		Kirby Marine	Pennicott Wilderness Cruises	Bruny Island Cruises and Tasman Island Cruises	43
		Kirby Marine	Pennicott Wilderness Cruises	Bruny Island Cruises and Tasman Island Cruises	43
Sea Dragon		Kirby Marine	Pennicott Wilderness Cruises	Iron Pot Cruises	20
Minke		Kirby Marine	Pennicott Wilderness Cruises	Iron Pot Cruises	20
Little Penguin		Kirby Marine	Pennicott Wilderness Cruises	Iron Pot Cruises	20
The Blade	2015	Alufab Marine & Fabrication	Pennicott Wilderness Cruises	Pennicott Wilderness Cruises	30
Southern Edge	2019	Alufab Marine & Fabrication	Pennicott Wilderness Cruises	Pennicott Wilderness Cruises	22

Previously

Name	Year built	Builder	Initial Ownership	Current Ownership / Fate	Max. Passengers
MV Cartela	1912	Purdon & Featherstone	Huon, Channel & Peninsula Steamship Company	Franklin, Tasmania	500
MV Bundeena	1946	W Holmes Bros	Captain Robert Ryall	Lavender Bay, Sydney	198
Surprise	1889	Tom Purdon		Unknown	
Success renamed Kathleen	c. 1880	Jacob Bailey Chandler		Unknown	
Result				Unknown	
Victory	c. 1880	Jacob Bailey Chandler		Unknown	
Silver Crown	1889	Bayes Bros, William Bayes		Unknown	
Huon	1892			Unknown	
Enterprise	1872	John Clark		Unknown	
VS Kangaroo	1903	Lt-Governor William Denison		Bellerive, Tasmania – sank 1929	
SS Derwent	1905			Unknown	590
SS Rosny	1913				
SS Lindisfarne				Unknown	
SS Reemere	1910	Purdon & Featherstone		Seen trading in Vanuatu in 2010	
Lurgurena	1926			Unknown	
SS Lottah	1901	John Wilson		Unknown	
SS Ronnie	1903			Unknown	
SS Breone	c. 1910	Frederick Moore		Unknown	
Bass	1911	Frederick Moore		Unknown	
SS Beagle				Unknown	6 vehicles
MV Emmalisa (Formally Regent Star, Nowra, Challenger Head, Kangaroo)	1947		Hobart Historic Cruises	Port Huon, Tas	
SS Marana		Purdon & Featherstone		Became a fishing trawler	
Monarch				Sank at lime Kilns	
Emu		P Degraves & J Gray		Sank New Norfolk, Tas Bridge 1897	
Maweena	1913	Purdon & Featherstone		Burnt Bellerive, Tas 1929	
SS Togo renamed (HMAS Phillip)	1905	Fred Moore	James Rowe & Sons	Decomm. 1931 – Gutted Mt. Direction, East Risdon 1946	500
MV Excella	1912	John Dalgleish	James Rowe & Sons	Unknown	
SS Mangana previously George Peat	1930	Tasmanian Steam Navigation Company		Unknown	37 vehicles
SS Taranna	1893			Unknown	120
Ray Larsson	1970	Tamar Steel Boats, Launceston		Unknown	
O’Hara Booth renamed Sydney	1974			Port Jackson	120
Phoenix				Unknown	
Kosciusko	1911	David Drake Limited, Sydney	Sydney Ferries Limited, to Hobart 1975	Prince of Wales Bay – Burnt	785
Lady Ferguson		David Drake Limited, Sydney	Sydney Ferries Limited	rotten and broken up 1975	
Wakatere (hovercraft)	1973	Hovermarine, Southampton		Matiatia, Wakatere, NZ – Scrapped	
MV Matthew Brady	1973	Sullivans Cove Ferry Company		Unknown	
MV James McCabe	1974	Sullivans Cove Ferry Company		Unknown	
Lady Wakehurst	1974	Carrington Slipways	Public Transport Commission	Solomon Islands	800
MV Martin Cash	1975	Bob Clifford		Sydney	
MV Jeremiah Ryan	1977	Incat		Unknown	
MV James Kelly	1979	Incat		Unknown	
H_{2}O Express			Hobart Water Taxis	Brisbane	30
SS Awittaka	1910		Huon, Channel & Peninsula Steamship Company	Sold to the administration of the British Solomon Islands Protectorate	
SS Dover			Unknown		
Rowitta	1910	Purdon & Featherstone		Flagstaff Hill, Vic – demolished	
ML Gayclite	c. 1943			Unknown	
ML Taruna	c. 1910	Charles Harold McKay		Unknown	
Melba	1921	Wilson Bros		Unknown	22 vehicles
MV Commodore				Cygnet	
MV Wanderer				Unknown	
MV Lady Jane			Captain Fells Historic Cruises	Abandoned	
MV Bowen			Backspring Pty Ltd	SeaLink Travel Group	30 vehicles
MV Moongalba	1974		Stradbroke Ferries	SeaLink Travel Group	30 vehicles
MV Harry O May previously Man On	1952	Hong Kong United Dockyard, Hong Kong		Launceston, Tas	48 vehicles
MV Mirambeena	1991	Tamar Steel Boats, Launceston	Tasmanian Government	Disassembled 2022	74 vehicles

== Sources ==
- John Duffy and Louis Rodway, The Cock of the River "Cartela", 1996
- https://web.archive.org/web/20140927001436/http://hobartwatertaxis.com/about-us/
