= River class =

River class may refer to:

== Destroyers ==
- River-class destroyer (1903), ships of the Royal Navy (UK) built in the early 20th century that served in World War I
- River-class destroyer (1931), ships of the Royal Canadian Navy that served in World War II
- River-class destroyer escort, frigates built for the Royal Australian Navy post World War II
- River-class torpedo-boat destroyer, ships of the Royal Australian Navy that served in World War I
- River-class destroyer (2030s), ships of the Royal Canadian Navy based on the Royal Navy's Type 26 frigate design

== Other ships ==
- River-class frigate, ships of World War II built for the Royal Navy, Royal Canadian Navy and other navies
- River-class minesweeper, former ships of the Royal Navy commissioned in the 1980s
- River-class patrol vessel, ships of the modern Royal Navy
- River-class submarine, ships of the interwar Royal Navy that saw service in World War II
- River-class mine hunter, ships of the South African Navy
- River-class ferry, a ferry type used in Sydney, Australia
- Parramatta River-class ferry, a ferry type used in Sydney, Australia

== See also ==
- River class locomotive (disambiguation)
