= Experiment (1832 ship) =

Ferry

Experiment was one of the first ferries servicing the Sydney Cove to Parramatta run, and later became Brisbane's first ferry.

The first regular ferry services between Sydney Cove and Parramatta began in 1831 with paddle steamers Surprise and Sophia Jane servicing the route. Both boats were financially unsuccessful and were soon used elsewhere. Passengers begrudgingly returned to slow and unreliable watermen's passage boats, and a Mr Singleton ordered a new ferry in order to fill this gap. Due to scarcity and high cost of steam engines in the colony of Sydney, the ferry was powered by four horses working a treadmill around a capstan that drove the paddles.

Weighing about 80 tonnes and 24 metres in length, Experiment's first trip to Parramatta was made on 5 October 1832. With a capacity of 20 tonnes of cargo and 100 passengers, the vessel could average 5 knots. However, horse performance was unreliable, and Experiment found itself floating downstream on several occasions. Experiment lost £1,000 in the first three months and was sold to Edye Manning. He replaced the horses with a 12 hp (9 kW) steam engine and on 9 April 1835 she began five years of successful service as a paddle steamer ferrying both cargo and passengers. From the early 1840s, she mainly carried cargo and in 1846 was sent to Brisbane to become that town's first ferry.

== See also ==
- List of Sydney Harbour ferries
- Timeline of Sydney Harbour ferries
