= Brothers (ferry) =

Manly ferry owned and operated by John and Joseph Gerard

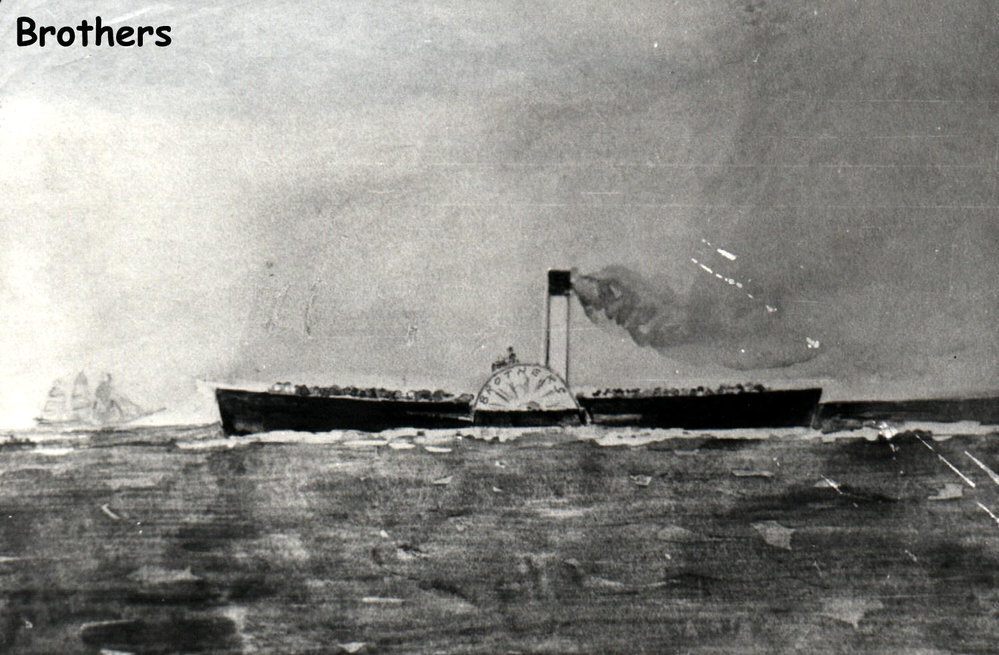
- Anonymous painting of Brothers

History
- Name: Brothers
- Owner: 1847—: John and Joseph Gerrard
- Operator: 1847–: John and Joseph Gerard
- Port of registry: 1847–1886: Sydney
- Route: 1847–1848: Circular Quay–Blues Point
- Builder: Thomas Chowney, Pyrmont, New South Wales
- Launched: 1847
- Maiden voyage: 9 October 1847
- In service: 1847
- Out of service: 1886
- Identification: Official number: 59513
- Fate: Broken up 1886

General characteristics
- Type: Ferry
- Tonnage: 23 GRT
- Length: 20.66 m (67 ft 9 in)
- Beam: 3.60 m (12 ft)
- Decks: 1
- Installed power: 1 × steam engine 18 bhp (13 kW)
- Capacity: 50 passengers

Brothers, also known as The Brothers, was a Manly ferry owned and operated by John and Joseph Gerard. She was built in 1847 by Thomas Chowney Pyrmont for use on Sydney Harbour.

== Concept and construction ==
Brothers was a small timber paddle wheel steam ship and one of the earliest constructed in the colony. A sporadic ferry service to the Manly area had been established in the 1830s provided by a small sailing ketch operated by Barney Kearns and that service ran between Balgowlah and Balmoral after which passengers had to head overland to Milson's Point and then be rowed across the harbour by a waterman. It did not last long and passengers faced a long and difficult overland trip.

== Service history ==
Brothers began her career on Saturday, 9 October 1847 initially engaged to run from Windmill Street in The Rocks to Blues Point from 8am until 6.30pm. It is unlikely that she ran to a timetable, probably only doing the trip when there was a demand. In 1848 she shifted to the Manly route on a sporadic service which was to change in 1853 when Henry Gilbert Smith chartered the vessel following his opening up of Manly as a holiday destination. In this role she became the first scheduled ferry between Manly and Sydney along her with running mate, the 1858-built PS Phantom.

Brothers remained on the Manly route for some years and was eventually sold to Port Stephens where she was hulked and used as a timber store, eventually being broken up in 1886.

== See also ==
- List of Sydney Harbour ferries
- Timeline of Sydney Harbour ferries

== Bibliography ==
- Mead, Tom (1988), The Seven Mile Ships, Manly Ferries of Sydney Harbour, Sydney Child & Associates, ISBN 978-0-86777-091-9, Unknown ID 386.6099441 MEA.
- Prescott, Anthony (1984), Sydney Ferry Fleets, Ronald H. Parsons, ISBN 0-909418-30-6.
- Andrews, Graeme (1994), The Ferries of Sydney (3 ed.), Trident Publication, ISBN 978-0-424-00202-6, ISBN 0-424-00202-7.
