= Richardson Devine Marine =

Shipbuilding company in Australia

- Type: Private
- Industry: Shipbuilding
- Founded: 1989
- Headquarters: Hobart, Tasmania
- Products: Boats
- Website: www.rdm.com.au

Richardson Devine Marine is an shipbuilding company based in Hobart, Tasmania founded in 1989.

A number of vessels are based on designs from Incat Crowther. In 2009, it won the Tasmanian Export Award.

== Deliveries ==
Image	Hull No	Length	Latest name	Operator	Country	Class	Notes
		17.5m	Matthew Flinders	Manly Fast Ferry	Australia	PF	
		15m	George Bass	Inter Island Ferries (Aust)	Australia	PF	
		23m	SeaMelbourne		Australia	PF	
			Australian Spirit		Australia	PF	
			Halicat		Australia	PF	
		24m	Wanderer II	World Heritage Cruises	Australia	PF	
		26m	Wanderer III	World Heritage Cruises	Australia	PF	
		25m	Peppermint Bay I (Lady Jane Franklin)	Peppermint Bay Cruises	Australia	PF	
		24m	Marana	Port Arthur Historic Site	Australia	PF	
		29m	Adventurer		New Zealand	PF	
		32m	Lady Jane Franklin II	Gordon River Cruises	Australia	PF	
		31m	Patea Explorer	Real Journeys	New Zealand	PF	
		22m	Peppermint Bay II	Peppermint Bay Cruises	Australia	PF	
		23m	Luminosa	Real Journeys	New Zealand	PF	
		32m	Discovery	World Heritage Cruises	Australia	PF	
		16m	Cuttlefish	Cuttlefish Cruises	Australia	PF	
	045	35m	Eagle	World Heritage Cruises	Australia	PF	
	046	32m	Premium Dream	石垣島ドリーム観光 Ishigaki Dream Tours石垣島ドリーム観光	Japan	PF	
	047	45m	Ipipiri	Hauraki Blue Cruises	New Zealand	PF	
	048	24m	Unlimited		Australia	WB	
	049	35m	Kilimanjaro	Azam Marine	Tanzania	PF	
	050	28.6m	Limitless		Australia	WB	
	051	35m	Kilimanjaro II	Azam Marine	Tanzania	PF	
	052	28m	Strait Shooter	Carpentaria Contracting	Australia	WB	
	053	45m	Cat Cocos Isle of La Digue	Inter Island Boats	Seychelles	PF	
	054	38m	Kilimanjaro III	Azam Marine	Tanzania	PF	
	055	35m	Outer Limit		Australia	WB	
	056	26m	Cahaya Baru	Cocos (Keeling) Islands	Cocos Islands	PF	
	057	45m	Kilimanjaro IV	Azam Marine	Tanzania	PF	
	058	32m	Super Dream	Ishigaki Dream Tours石垣島ドリーム観光	Japan	PF	
	059	24m	Elizabeth Cook	Captain Cook Cruises	Australia	PF	
	060	24m	Mary Reibey	Captain Cook Cruises	Australia	PF	
	061	24m	Annabelle Rankin	Captain Cook Cruises	Australia	PF	
	062	39m	Kilimanjaro V	Azam Marine	Tanzania	PF	
	063	24m	Violet McKenzie	Captain Cook Cruises	Australia	PF	
	064	39m	Kilimanjaro VI	Azam Marine	Tanzania	PF	
	065	35m	Harbour Master	World Heritage Cruises	Australia	PF	
	066	21m	Sealink	Tommy Lyons	Australia	PF	
	067	12m	Cockle Bay	Captain Cook Cruises	Australia	PF	
	068	12m	Blackwattle Bay	Captain Cook Cruises	Australia	PF	
	069	21m	Passenger Transfer Barges	Harbour of Dar es Salaam	Tanzania	WB	
	070	21m	Passenger Transfer Barges	Harbour of Dar es Salaam	Tanzania	WB	
	071	26m	Cat Cocos – Isle of La Digue	Inter Island Boats	Seychelles	PF	
	072	33m	Spirit of the Wild	Gordon River Cruises	Australia	PF	
	073	45m	Kilimanjaro VII	Azam Marine	Tanzania	PF	
	074	29m	Freya (MR2)	Museum of Old & New Art	Australia	PF	
	075	44.9m	Bruny Island Ferry #1 (Nairana)	SeaLink Travel Group	Australia	VF	
	076	44.9m	Bruny Island Ferry #2 (Parrabah)	SeaLink Travel Group	Australia	VF	
	077	35m	Harbour Master II	World Heritage Cruises	Australia	PF	
	078	53m	Kilimanjaro VIII	Azam Marine	Tanzania	PF	
	079	24m	Odalisque III	Tasmanian Expedition Cruises	Australia	PF	
	080	12m	Daphne	Work Barge	Australia	PF	
	081	24m	Frances Bodkin	Sydney Ferries	Australia	Parramatta	
	082	24m	John Nutt	Sydney Ferries	Australia	Parramatta	
	083	24m	Isobel Bennett	Sydney Ferries	Australia	Parramatta	
	084	24m	Martin Green	Sydney Ferries	Australia	Parramatta	
	085	24m	Ruby Payne-Scott	Sydney Ferries	Australia	Parramatta	
	086	24m	Norman Selfe	Sydney Ferries	Australia	Parramatta	
	087	24m	Jack Mundey	Sydney Ferries	Australia	Parramatta	
	088	35m	Strait Shooter II	Carpentaria Contracting	Australia	WB	

As international deliveries of ferries is challenging, Richardson Devine Marine uses heavy lift ships like the Thorco Clairvaux.
