= Lady Harewood (1791 ship) =

History

Great Britain
- Name: Lady Harewood
- Builder: Randall & Brent, Rotherhithe
- Launched: 14 September 1791
- Fate: Condemned at Singapore in 1833

General characteristics
- Tons burthen: Pre-1799:300, or 313(bm); Post 1799: 390, or 392, or 429, or 42913/94, or 432 (bm)
- Armament: 2 × 12-pounder guns

Lady Harewood (or Lady Harwood), was launched in 1791 at Rotherhithe. She was initially a West Indiaman and in 1800 a French privateer captured her, but a Royal Navy frigate recaptured her two days later. She made three voyages transporting convicts to Australia, one in 1829 to Van Diemen's Land, and two, in 1831 and 1832, to New South Wales. In 1833 she became leaky on her way to Singapore from Australia and was condemned and sold at Singapore.

== Career ==
Lady Harwood first appeared in Lloyd's Register (LR) in 1792 with T. Brennan, master, Elliott & Co., owners, and trade London–Barbados.

Year	Master	Owner	Trade	Source and notes
1795	T. Brenan	Elliott & Co.	London–Barbados	LR
1800	T. Brenan	Elliott & Co.	London–Barbados	LR; lengthened in 1799

In December 1795 Lady Harewood, Brenan, master, put into Portsmouth having sustained damage to her rudder on the Oars.

Capture and re-capture: On 13 January 1800 Lady Harewood, Merriton, master, was sailing from London to Barbados when the French privateer Volteur captured her at 30°12′N 15°10′W. Volteur, of 20 guns and 175 men, sent Lady Harewood to Nantes. HMS Caroline later captured Volteur and sent her into Lisbon. (Note: Caroline captured "Vulture" on 15 February. Captain William Bowen, of Caroline, described Vulture as being out 38 days from Nantes. He described her as a "remarkably fast sailer", pierced for 22 guns, and armed with four 12-pounder guns, two brass 36-pounder carronades, and sixteen 6-pounder iron guns, two of which she threw overboard while he was chasing her. She had 137 men aboard, and was under the command of Citizen Bazile Aug. Euo Laray. The 36-pounder carronades were actually obusiers de vaiseau.)

At daybreak on 15 January, HMS Apollo sighted a vessel that proceeded to attempt to evade closer scrutiny. After a short chase Apollo recaptured Lady Harwood, which had been part of the convoy that Apollo was escorting, but which had gotten separated on 1 January at the onset of gale. Captain Peter Halkett, of Apollo gave the name of the French privateer that had captured Lady Harewood as Vautour.

Year	Master	Owner	Trade	Source
1805	T. Brenan; J.Budge	Elliott & Co.	London–St Kitts	LR; lengthened in 1799
1806	J.Budge; Merriton	Elliott & Co.	London–Barbados	LR; lengthened in 1799
1808	Wilson	Elliott & Co. Nelson & Co.	London–Barbados	LR; lengthened in 1799; small repairs 1806
1810	W. Wilson	Adams	London–Barbados	RS; lengthened in 1799
1812	Kent	Todd & Co.	London–Jamaica	RS; lengthened in 1799; good repair 1811
1816	C. Young	Curling & Co.	London–Jamaica	LR; lengthened in 1799; good repair 1811
1820	Young	Spencer	London–Grenada	RS; new deck and bottom 1817
1825	Lewis	Spencer & Co.	London–New Brunswick	LR; lengthened in 1799; good repair 1811
1830	R. Lemon	Brocklebank	London–New South Wales	RS; damages, small, and large repairs 1829

1st convict voyage (1829): Captain Richard Limon sailed from London on 26 March 1829. Lady Harewood arrived at Hobart on 28 July. She had embarked 208 male convicts, one of whom died on the voyage. Forty officers and men of the 40th Regiment of Foot provided the guard. When she sailed for London on 10 March 1830 she carried 727 bales wool, 260 casks of whale oil, 3 casks of head matter, 24 casks of sperm oil, 428 bundles of whalebone, 286 logs of lightwood, 26 tons of mimosa bark, four casks of seal skins, and one cask of spermacetti.

2nd convict voyage (1830–1831): Captain Richard W. Stonehouse sailed from Sheerness on 30 October 1830. Lady Harewood arrived at Sydney on 4 March 1831. She had embarked 216 male convicts and she landed 214, one having died on the voyage. One convict had been disembarked before Lady Harewood sailed for Australia. Lady Harewood left Port Jackson on 12 June, bound for London. The steam vessel Sophia Jane towed Lady Harewood down the harbour in miserable squally weather. This was the first application in Australia of steam power to such a task. She was carrying a cargo of 281 bales of wool, 200 casks of sperm oil, 76 casks of black oil, 74 casks of coconut oil, 357 bales of flax, 1700 hides, 84 planks of Australian cedar, and 15 casks of seal skins. By September Lady Harewood was at Rio de Janeiro on her way back to London; she arrived at London on 8 December. After Rio she had had to put into Bahia, difficult weather having forced her to throw a considerable portion of her cargo overboard.

3rd convict voyage (1832): Captain Stonehouse sailed from Portsmouth on 25 March 1832. Lady Harewood stopped at St Jago and then arrived at Sydney on 5 August. She had embarked 200 male convicts and one died on the voyage. She also brought with her 400 varieties of vines, with two cuttings of each. She then sailed in ballast for Batavia, via Torres Strait and in company with Red Rover and Madeline.

== Fate ==
Lady Harewood arrived at Singapore. She sailed but then had to return, having suffered damage. She was condemned as unseaworthy on 16 July 1833 and sold for breaking up.
