= Hobart Historic Cruises =

Tasmanian cruise line

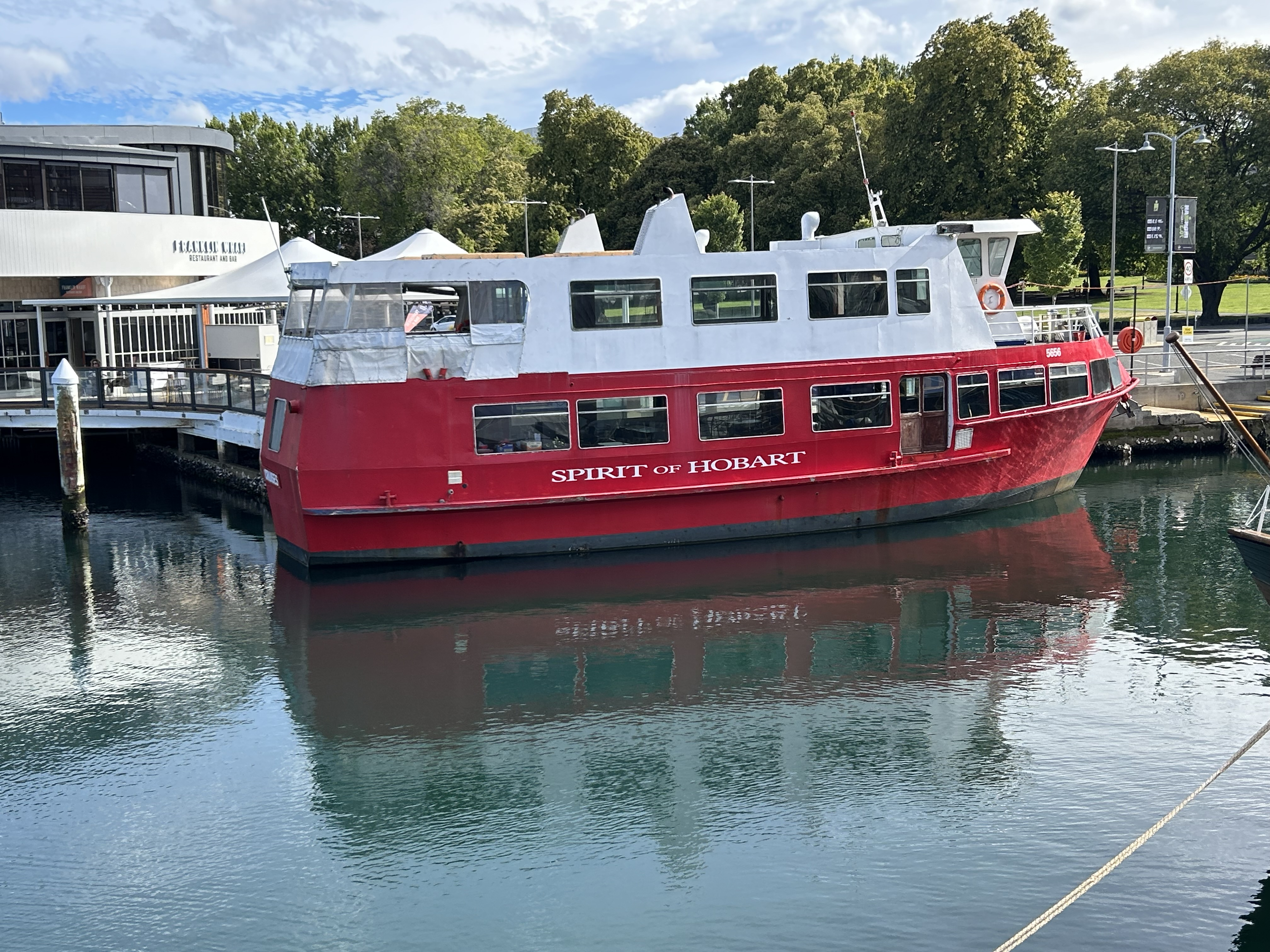
- Industry: Tourism
- Founded: 1980's name change 2014
- Headquarters: Hobart, Australia
- Products: River Derwent Cruises, Charters
- Owner: LJ Family Trust
- Website: https://www.hobarthistoriccruises.com.au/

Hobart Historic Cruises operates cruises and charter routes on the River Derwent, Tasmania. These ferry tours have operated on the Derwent Harbour since the 1980s.

== Ferry routes ==
The longer ferry route travels north and south of the Tasman Bridge. The other two go north and south, respectively.

== Bus tours ==
Bus tours visit Port Arthur, Bruny Island, Richmond, Mt Wellington and Devil Zoo.

== History ==
Captain Fell's Historic Ferries had a long history of operating ferries on the River Derwent. The owner of the Spirit of Hobart was Peter O'May, a descendant of the original O'May Family that have been operating ferries on the River Derwent since 1863.

The business ownership was transferred from Peter O'May to the LJ Family Trust in September 2013. During this time, the business began to encounter controversy after a series of workplace incidents and poor public perception

== Ferries ==
Name	Year built	Builder	Initial Ownership	Current Ownership / Fate	Max. Passengers
MV Emmalisa (formally Regent Star, Nowra, Challenger Head, Kangaroo)	1947		Hobart Historic Cruises	Sold - Restored moved to Port Huon, Tas	
MV Lady Jane			Captain Fells Historic Cruises	Port Huon, Tas - Abandoned	
Spirit of Hobart previously Southern Cross	1982		Hobart Historic Cruises	Hobart Historic Cruises	150
