= Phantom (ferry) =

Australian iron paddle steamboat

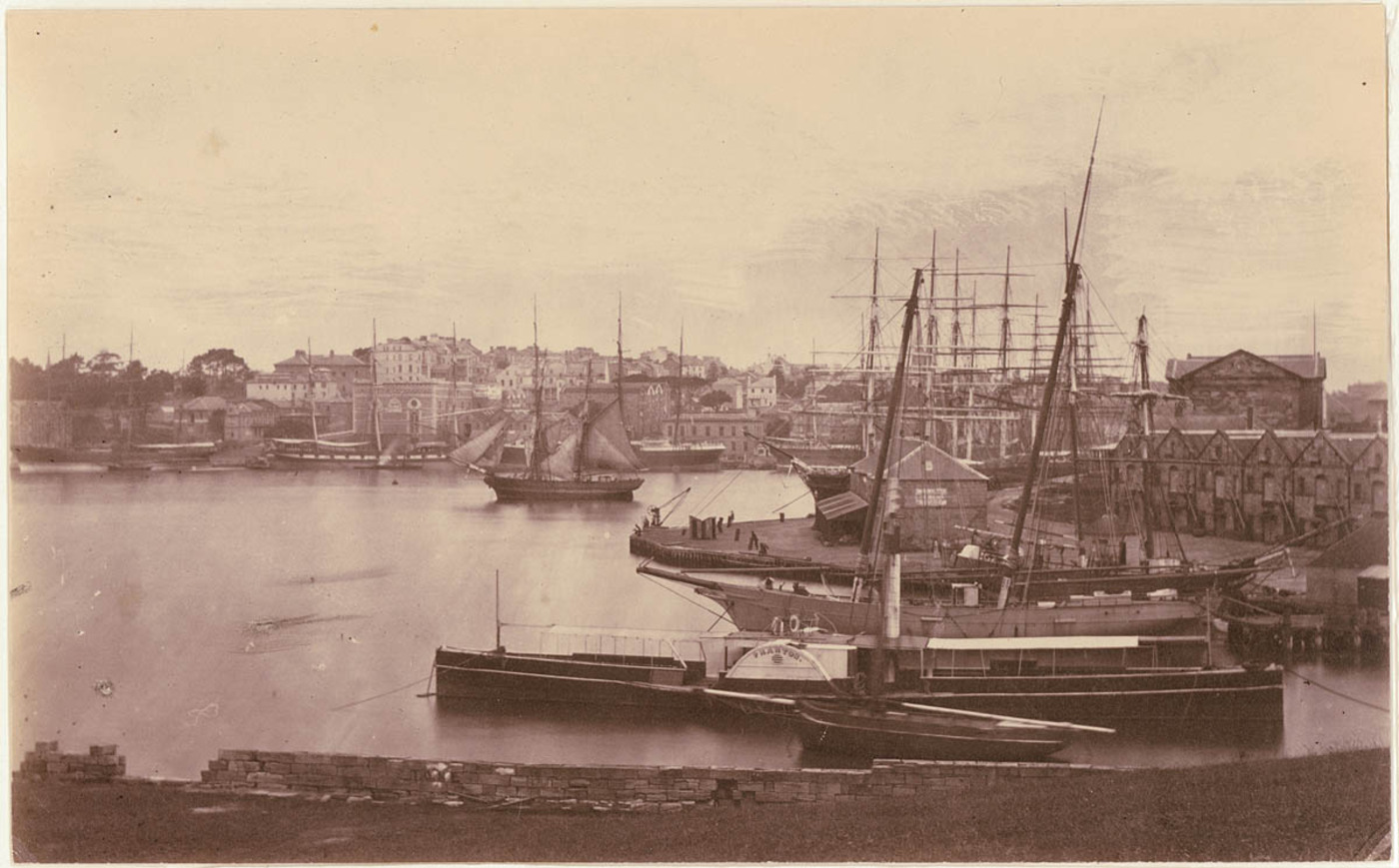
- Phantom at west Circular Quay in what is now known as Campbells Cove.

History
- Name: Phantom
- Operator: Port Jackson and Manly Steamship Company?
- Builder: JF Dow & Co., Williamstown, Victoria
- Launched: 1859
- Out of service: 1885
- Fate: Broken up

General characteristics
- Tonnage: 63 tonnes
- Length: 36.3 m
- Beam: 4.0 m
- Speed: 12 knots
- Capacity: 166 passengers

Phantom was an iron paddle steamer on Sydney Harbour that ran the Circular Quay to Manly run. Built in 1858, she was the first large double-ended Manly ferry, a basic configuration that has continued through to the contemporary Manly ferries.

== Service history ==
Phantom was built by JF Dow and Co of Melbourne. Her 50 hp steam engines were supplied by the builder and could push her to over 12 knots. She could carry up to 166 passengers. She steamed up to Sydney over four days arriving on 19 May 1859. She is thought to be the first vessel to wear the long-standing Manly ferry livery of dark green hull and white funnel with black topping. This livery was discontinued in the 1970s when the ferries came under the control of the NSW State Government's Public Transport Commission.

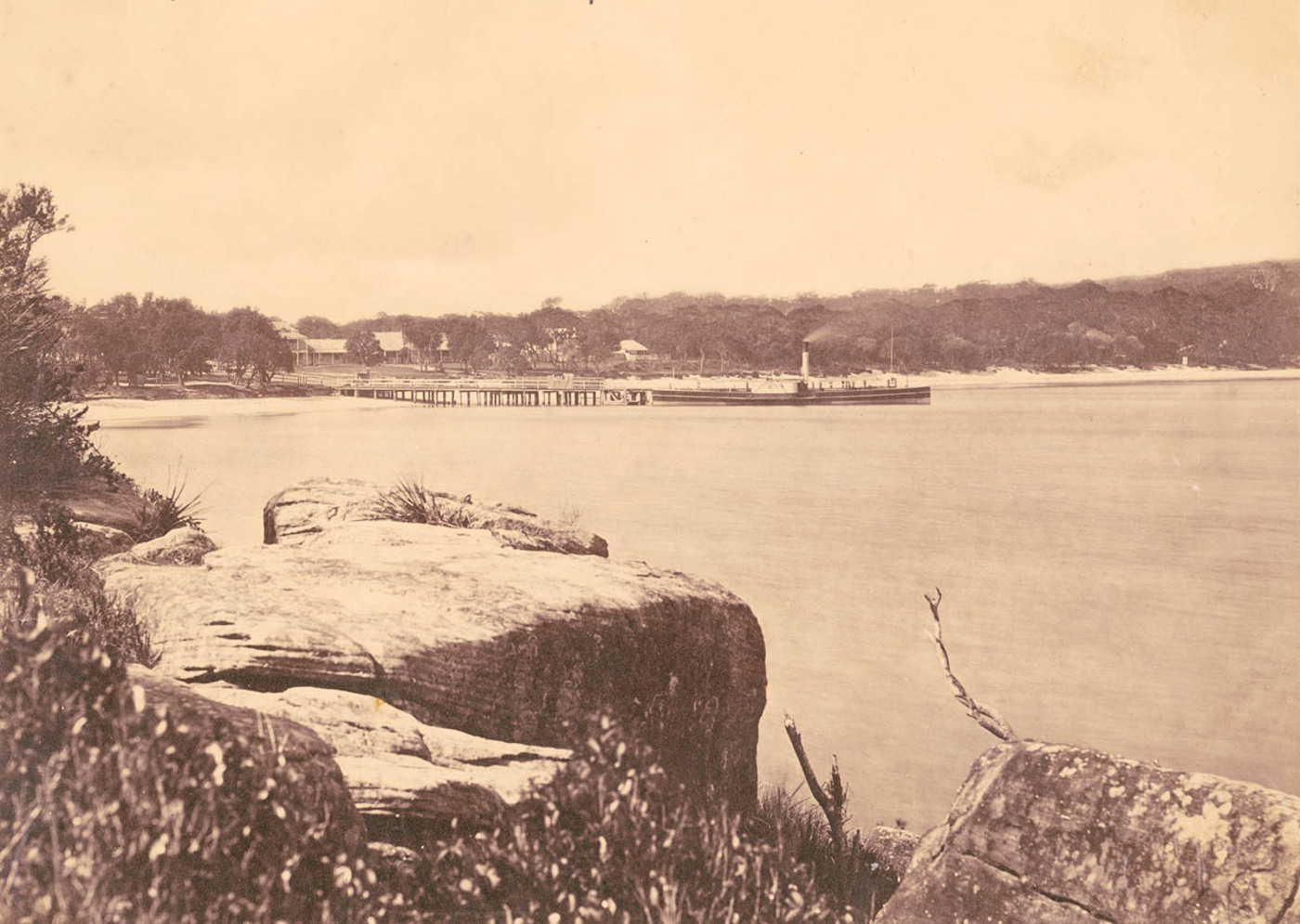
At Manly Wharf, 1870s

She was bought in 1864 by the newly created Brighton and Manly Steam Ferry Company. Being long (36.3 m) and narrow (beam 4.0 m) with a shallow draft, rides across the Sydney Heads in bad weather could be uncomfortable. This was mitigated with 25-kilogram balance weight bags slung on poles to the windward side. All subsequent Manly ferries have been designed to counter the problem of beam swells as the ferries crossed the Sydney Heads.

She was known for blowing smoke rings from her funnel. On one trip across the Sydney Heads in rough weather, waves doused her fires and she lost control. A jury mast and sails were rigged and she arrived in Sydney two hours late.

Phantom was a success on the Manly run, and double-ended ferries remain the standard on the Manly route through to the present day. Phantom was sold out of the Manly run in 1878 and was later used by Charles Jeanerret as a ferry and work boat. She was broken up in Pyrmont in 1885.

== See also ==
- List of Sydney Harbour ferries
- Timeline of Sydney Harbour ferries
