= Ruby Langford Ginibi =

Indigenous Australian author and historian

- Born: Ruby Maude Anderson; 26 January 1934; Coraki, New South Wales, Australia
- Died: 1 October 2011 (aged 77); Fairfield, New South Wales, Australia
- Education: Casino High School, New South Wales, Australia
- Occupations: Indigenous Australian (Bundjalung) historian, author and lecturer
- Children: Nine

Ruby Langford Ginibi (26 January 1934 – 1 October 2011) was an acclaimed Bundjalung author, historian and lecturer on Aboriginal history, culture and politics.

== Names ==
According to Langford's memoir, Don't Take Your Love to Town, her parents married in September 1934, eight months after her birth, and she was originally named Ruby Maude Anderson. Langford was her husband's surname, and Ginibi is a Bundjalung honorific.

== Life and career ==
Born at the Box Ridge Mission, Coraki on New South Wales's northern coast, Langford was raised at Bonalbo and attended high school in Casino. At 15, she moved to Sydney where she qualified as a clothing machinist. She had nine children by various relationships, but only legally married once, to Peter Langford, whose surname she took as her own. Three of Langford's children predeceased her. Graphic designer Nikita Ridgeway is one of her grandchildren. Her best-known book was the autobiographical Don't Take Your Love to Town, published in 1988, which won the Australian Human Rights and Equal Opportunity Commission Human Rights Award for Literature. She wrote non-fiction books, essays, poems and short stories.

== Death ==
Langford had been suffering kidney problems and high blood pressure before her death at Fairfield Hospital, Sydney, aged 77, on 1 October 2011.

== Recognition ==
She received an inaugural History Fellowship from the NSW Ministry for the Arts in 1994, an inaugural honorary fellowship from the National Museum of Australia, Canberra, in 1995, and an inaugural doctorate of letters (Honors Causia) from La Trobe University, Victoria in 1998.

In 2005 she was awarded the New South Wales Premier's Literary Awards Special Award. Her works are studied in Australian high schools and universities. In 2006, she won the Australia Council for the Arts Writers' Emeritus Award. She received the award with its prize of $50,000 at a ceremony during the Sydney Writers' Festival. The award recognises the achievements of writers over the age of 65. In 2008, Ginibi was a Don't DIS my ABILITY ambassador.

In 2020, a river-class ferry on the Sydney Ferries network was named in her honour.

== Bibliography ==
- Don't Take Your Love to Town (Penguin, 1988); ISBN 978-0-7022-3595-5
- Real Deadly (Angus & Robertson, 1992); ISBN 0-207-17421-0
- My Bundjalung People (UQP, 1994); ISBN 0-7022-2637-8
- Haunted by the Past (Allen & Unwin, 1999); ISBN 1-86448-758-5
- All My Mob (UQP, 2007); ISBN 978-0-7022-3596-2
- A Journey into Bundjalung Country, with Pam Johnston
- Ruby Langford Ginibi, co-authored with John Barnes and Blanca Fullana
