= Surprise (paddle steamer) =

Australian paddle steamer

History

Australia
- Builder: Henry Gilbert
- Launched: 14 March 1831
- Fate: Unknown

General characteristics
- Type: Paddle steamer
- Length: 58 ft (18 m)

Surprise was the first paddle steamer, and the first steam powered vessel, built and run in Australia. It was built possibly on the Parramatta River, by shipbuilder Henry Gilbert, and launched in Sydney on 14 March 1831. The vessel was 24 metres long with a draught of 0.6 metres.

Its first voyage was on 1 June on the Parramatta River under the command of Captain Devlin during which the vessel reached 3 knots. Soon her crew were able to increase this speed to 5 knots.

The first steamer to operate in Australian waters was Sophia Jane, built in England which arrived in 1831. It was having its paddles fitted when Surprise made its first voyage.

On 30 May, Surprize [sic] advertised a service to Parramatta. At that time ferry services were not advertised in Sydney. Sophia Jane advertised the first cruise on 13 June. From 8 August, Surprise published a timetable in the Sydney Herald.

Surprise was built to operate on the Parramatta River. Fares were two shillings and sixpence for first class and two shillings for second class, and on weekends she was used for excursion trips. Surprise was not a financial success and after six months her owners, the Smith Brothers, sold her to Tasmanian interests. With both Surprise and Sophia Jane removed from the Parramatta River service, passengers returned to watermen's boats. Newer steamers, such as Experiment, Australia, and Rapid were put onto the Parramatta River service later in the 1830s with various degrees of success.

Surprise's fate is not known.

== See also ==
- List of Sydney Harbour ferries
- Timeline of Sydney Harbour ferries
