= River class locomotive =

The River class were classes of locomotives on a number of railways:

- Highland Railway River Class
- Nigerian Railways River class
- SECR K and SR K1 classes – Two classes of 20 two-cylinder (K) and 1 three-cylinder (K1) 2-6-4T locomotives
