= River-class ferry =

Model of ferry operating in Sydney, Australia

River class
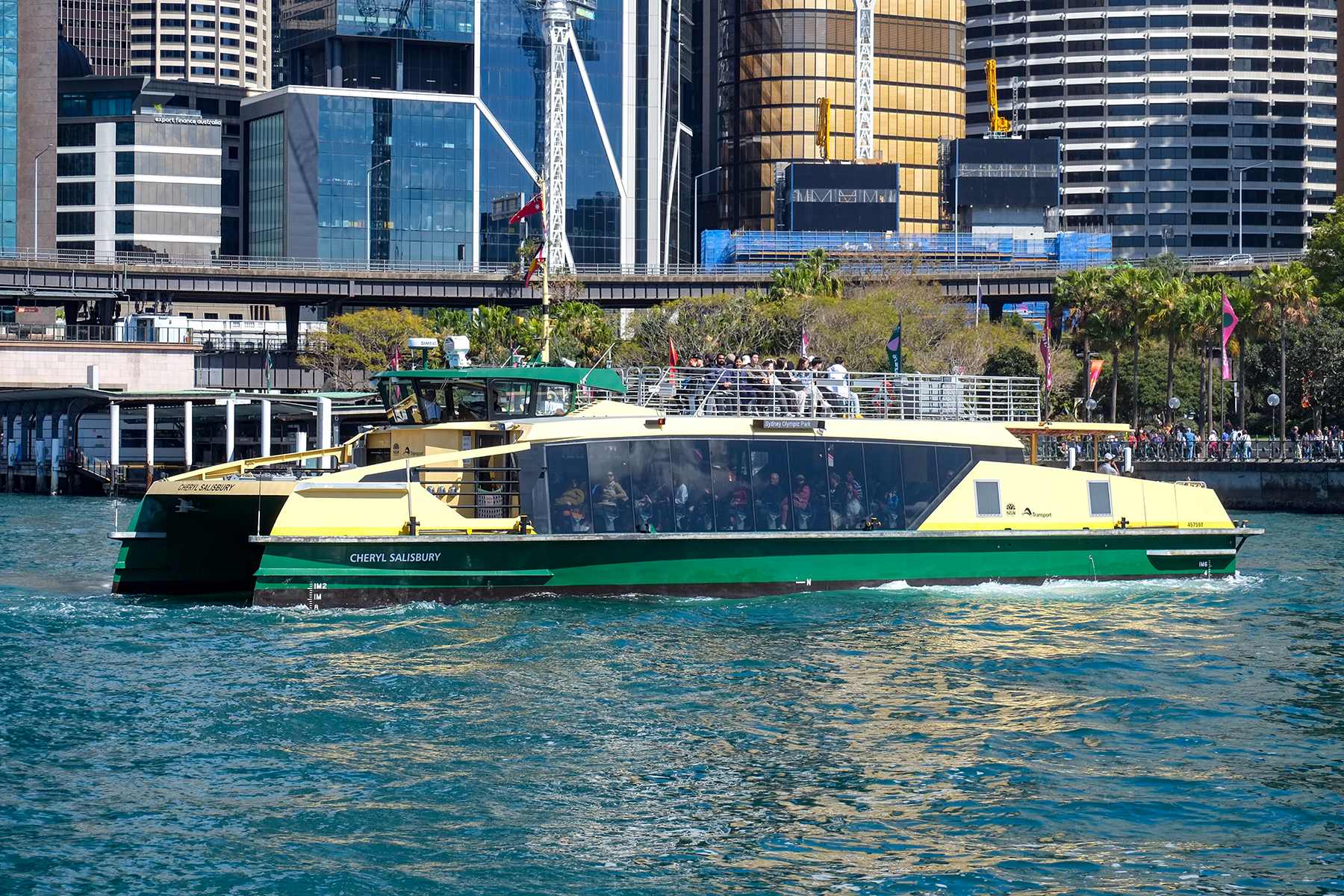
- Cheryl Salisbury in September 2023

Class overview
- Builders: Designers Incat Crowther
- Operators: Transdev Sydney Ferries
- Preceded by: RiverCats
- Built: 2020
- In service: 2021
- Completed: 10
- Active: 10

General characteristics
- Type: Catamaran
- Length: 25 metres (82 ft)
- Beam: 7 metres (23 ft)
- Decks: 2
- Capacity: 200
- Crew: 3

The River class is a ferry type operated by Transdev Sydney Ferries on Sydney Harbour.

== History ==
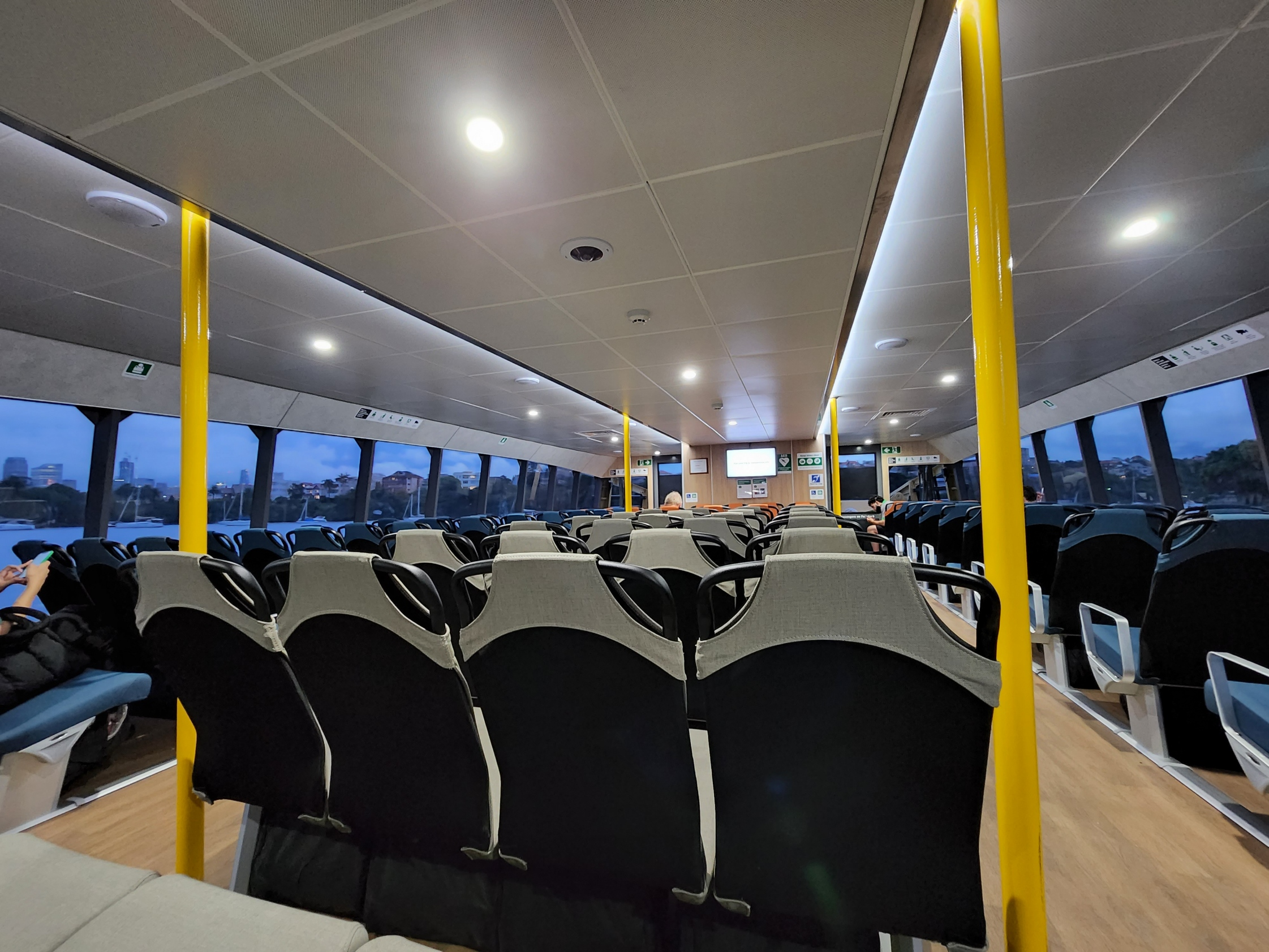
Interior passenger saloon of Kurt Fearnley

In September 2017, Transport for NSW called for expressions of interest for four new ferries for Parramatta River ferry services. However, after the bids were higher than expected, the project was shelved.

Upon being awarded the contract to operate the Sydney Ferries concession in 2019, Transdev Sydney Ferries placed an order for 10 new ferries to be built in Indonesia.

The first four arrived in Newcastle in August 2020 for final works and trials. The ferries were purchased to replace the SuperCat and HarbourCat-class Ferries. All were named after artists, athletes and authors.

The first entered service in October 2021, confined to daytime service until deemed suitable for night time operations.

In late 2022 the government announced it was looking for tenders to build a new fleet of Parramatta River-class ferries to replace the RiverCat-class ferries

== Issues and delays ==
A number of issues and defects on the ferries, totalling 43, delayed the service commencement dates by well over a year.

Identified issues and delays on the ferries included the presence of asbestos, sub-standard fit and finish, wheelhouse window angles making night operations dangerous, engine stalling, potential of fires or electrocution caused by sub standard electrical equipment and sub-standard steering components.

== Vessels ==
Name	Call sign	MMSI	Shipyard number	Keel laid	Namesake
Ethel Turner	457589	503106710	H388	25 February 2020	Ethel Turner
Ruth Park	457593	503106750	H389	29 February 2020	Ruth Park
Cheryl Salisbury	457597	503106690	H390	23 March 2020	Cheryl Salisbury
Lauren Jackson	458798	503106730	H391	23 March 2020	Lauren Jackson
Liz Ellis	457600	503106740	H392	23 March 2020	Liz Ellis
Kurt Fearnley	457594	503106720	H393	23 March 2020	Kurt Fearnley
Olive Cotton	457555	503100450	H395	25 August 2019	Olive Cotton
Margaret Olley	457590	503100470	H396	25 August 2019	Margaret Olley
Esme Timbery	457595	503100460	H397	25 August 2019	Esme Timbery
Ruby Langford Ginibi	457591	503100480	H398	25 August 2019	Ruby Langford Ginibi
