= Frances Bodkin =

Australian botanist and educator

- Born: 1937 (age 88–89); Darlinghurst
- Known for: Botany

Frances "Fran" Bodkin (born 1937 in Darlinghurst) is an Australian botanist and Dharawal elder. In the 1970s, she helped establish the Australian Botanic Garden Mount Annan near Sydney at a former meeting site of Indigenous people.

She is the author of Encyclopaedia Botanica: The Essential Reference Guide to Native and Exotic Plants in Australia (1986). More recently, she compiled the Dharawal Pharmacopeia, an on-line catalogue of native plants and their medicinal uses by aboriginal people.

Bodkin was cultural consultant on Jasmin Sheppard's production of Macq for Bangarra Dance Theatre in 2013.

In 2017, Bodkin received a UWS Community Award and in 2019, she was nominated for a Landcare Australia land management award. On 5 March 2024, Transport for NSW named the first Parramatta-class ferry after her.
