= Parramatta River-class ferry =

Type of ferry in Sydney

Parramatta River class
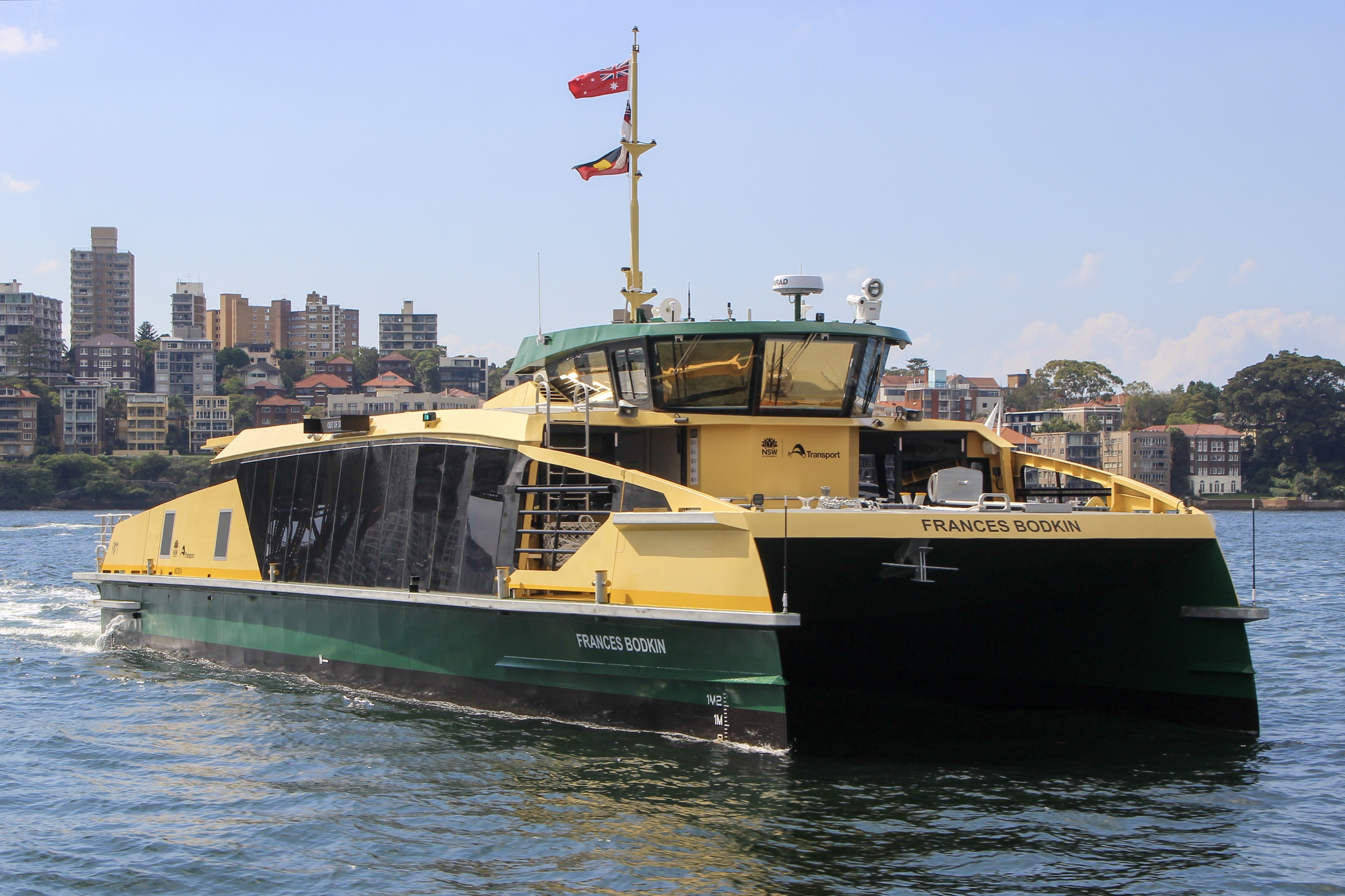
- Frances Bodkin at Circular Quay in April 2024

Class overview
- Builders: Richardson Devine Marine
- Operators: Transdev Sydney Ferries
- Planned: 7
- Completed: 7
- Active: 7

General characteristics
- Type: Catamaran
- Length: 24.95 metres
- Beam: 7.2 metres
- Draft: 1.35 metres
- Propulsion: 2 x Scania DI13 070M (405 kW / 550 hp @ 1800 rpm) via a ZF 2000 gearbox
- Speed: 26 knots (48 km/h; 30 mph)
- Capacity: 200

The Parramatta River class is a ferry type operated by Transdev Sydney Ferries on Sydney Harbour.

The ships are designed for future conversion to electric propulsion for low-emissions travel.

== History ==
In June 2023, Transport for NSW announced it had awarded Richardson Devine Marine a contract to build seven Incat Crowther designed ferries in Hobart to replace the RiverCats on Parramatta River services.

The ferries are named in honour of Australians who have made significant achievements in the fields of science, environment, and innovation. The first was delivered in March 2024.

Unlike the River-class ferry fleet, the new vessels do not include a top deck.

== Vessels ==
Photo of Vessel	Name	Call Sign	MMSI	Shipyard No	Launch date	Entered service	Namesake	Reference
MV Frances Bodkin leaving Huntleys Point, 2025.	Frances Bodkin	462934	503161930	081	12 February 2024	28 May 2024	Frances Bodkin	
MV John Nutt passing Newington Armory Wharf, 2025.	John Nutt	462936	503164160	082	29 April 2024	July 2024	John Nutt	
MV Isobel Bennett passing under Gladesville Bridge, 2025.	Isobel Bennett	462935	503167290	083	5 August 2024	27 November 2024	Isobel Bennett	
MV Martin Green at Kissing Point, 2025.	Martin Green	462938	503174880	084	9 November 2024	10 February 2025	Martin Green	
MV Ruby Payne Scott at Sydney Olympic Park, 2025.	Ruby Payne-Scott	462939	503178210	085	6 March 2025	3 June 2025	Ruby Payne-Scott	
MV Norman Selfe passing Ryde Wharf 2026.	Norman Selfe	462940	503178220	086	30 May 2025	5 December 2025	Norman Selfe	
MV Jack Mundey at Cockatoo Island, 2026.	Jack Mundey	462941	503178230	087	29 August 2025	17 December 2025	Jack Mundey	
