= Sophia Jane =

Australian paddle steamer

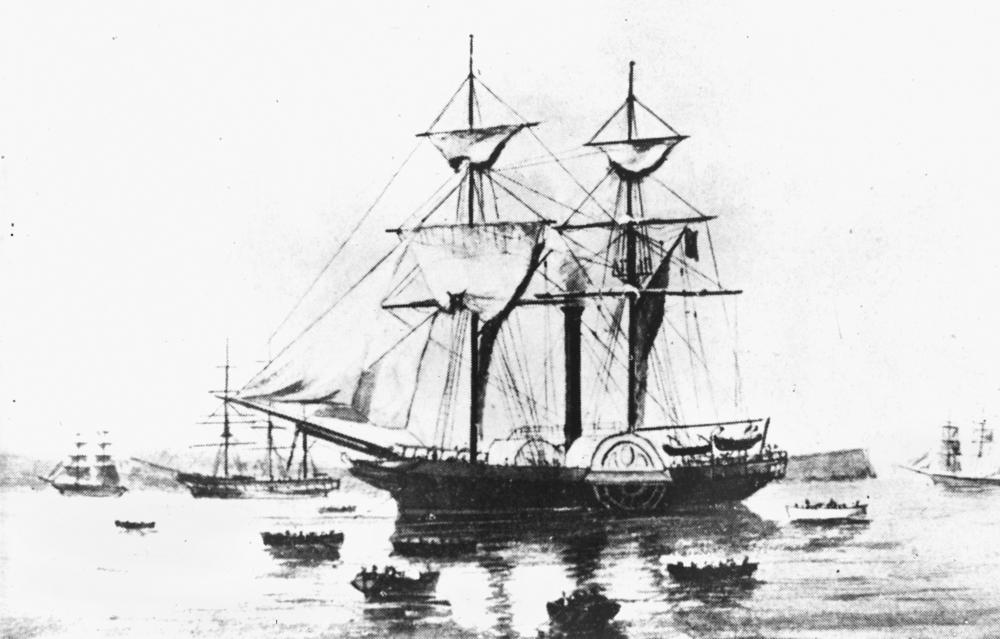
- Sophia Jane

History

Australia
- Builder: Barnes and Miller, Ratcliffe
- Launched: 1826
- In service: 1828
- Out of service: 1845
- Fate: Scrapped

General characteristics
- Type: Paddle steamer
- Tons burthen: 250; 150 or 154 Register
- Length: 126 ft (38 m) (deck)
- Beam: 20 ft (6.1 m)
- Installed power: 50 hp (37 kW) steam engine
- Speed: 7.7 kn (8.9 mph; 14.3 km/h)

Sophia Jane was the first paddle steamer to operate in the coastal waters of New South Wales (NSW). She was launched on the Thames in 1826 and arrived in Sydney in May 1831.

== Construction ==
Sophia Jane was an auxiliary steamer, like all the early steamers, using her paddle wheels only when winds were inadequate or contrary. The vessel was built by Barnes and Miller of Ratcliffe, pupils of James Watt, for passenger service between England and France and parts of the British islands. (Note: Various blogs, letters to editors and notes claim the hull was built by William Elias Evans. Contemporary references, including engineering and shipbuilding journals of the time, clearly state the ship was built by Barnes and Miller. Claims with regard to Evans need to be supported by similar high quality references. Steam engineer, Joseph Miller's letter to the Nautical Standard clearly states, "Sophia Jane was also built by Mr. Evans as a sea-going vessel." Reprinted in The Sydney Morning Herald, 31 August 1849. p. 3.)

== Service in Australia ==
Sophia Jane, under command of Captain Edward Biddulph, identified as having been Lieutenant, Royal Navy, and part owner, arrived at Sydney on 13 May 1831, having come by sail, with her paddle wheels stowed and her engine not yet commissioned. Six weeks earlier Australia's first steamer, the small river vessel Surprise, had been launched in March with intended use on the Parramatta River. Sophia Jane became an operational steamer before Surprise and was "the first steamer to turn a paddle-wheel in Sydney Harbour."

At Sydney the vessel's particulars were noted as being 250 tons builder's measurement, (Note: One of the ship volume measures expressed in "tons burden" based on a measurement formula.) 150 tons register, four years old but only operating two of those years in European waters, and considered one of the fastest sea going vessels built at the time. A specific speed reference notes the ship ran "the 60 knots from Newcastle to Sydney was seven and two-thirds hours, equal to nearly eight knots per hour in 1831" (Note: Note the old use of knot for distance and then speed as "knots per hour" – a term no longer used as a knot is now defined as one nautical mile per hour.) further noting "She has frequently towed ships of the largest class." Having been largely in the passenger service the ship had separate cabins for "gentlemen" with sixteen beds and "ladies" with eleven beds with a third for steerage passengers having twenty beds. In need additional beds could be added for a maximum of 54 passengers.

She was tried on a Sydney-Parramatta service however she was too deep in the draft and found more use coastal services including Newcastle and later the first run between Sydney and Wollongong.

On 12 June 1831 Sophia Jane towed Lady Harewood down the harbour as Lady Harewood set off for England. This was the first application in Australia of steam power to such a task. The reason for the tow was that weather conditions were miserable and squally.

However, at the same time there was a report that the ship's agent was under instructions to send her on to India unless she could be profitably sold in Australia. Sophia Jane advertised in the Sydney Herald on 13 June the first Australian steamship cruise to be held on 17 June.

Captain Biddulph sold shares in Sophia Jane and by August he had sold 54 of 64 shares.

In 1842, Charles Throsby Smith purchased her for use as a regular trading vessel between Sydney and Wollongong.

== Fate ==
In 1845 Sophia Jane grounded on a reef off Wollongong. She was re-floated, but later that year her owners, facing more extensive repairs, decided to lay her up. Her engine, however, was still operational and was installed in Phoenix.
