= Emu (disambiguation) =

The emu (Dromaius novaehollandiae) is a large, flightless Australian bird.

Emu may also refer to:

== Biology ==
- Emus (beetle), a genus of beetles
- Emu apple, one of three Australian plants
- Emu bush (disambiguation), a number of Australian plants
- Emu-wren, a bird in the genus Stipiturus

== Arts and entertainment ==
- Emu (puppet), used by Rod Hull
- Ernest Emu, a character in the Crash Bandicoot video games
- Emu Otori, a character in Hatsune Miku: Colorful Stage!

== Companies and brands ==
- Emu (beer), a Western Australian beer
- Emu Brewery, in Perth, Australia
- Emu Airways, a defunct Australian regional airline
- EMU Australia, a lifestyle brand
- E-mu Systems, a digital audio company

== Places ==
=== Australia ===
- Emu Bay, South Australia, on Kangaroo Island
  - Emu Bay Shale, a geological formation in Emu Bay
- Emu Brewery, a historic site in Perth
- Emu Creek (disambiguation), various places in Queensland
- Emu Field, South Australia, an atomic weapons test site
- Emu Flat, South Australia
- Emu Flat, Victoria, a suburb of Melbourne
- Emu Heights, New South Wales, a suburb of Sydney
- Emu Heights, Tasmania, a suburb of Burnie
- Emu Park, a suburb in Brisbane
- Emu Plains, a suburb of Sydney
- Emu Ridge, a suburb in the Australian Capital Territory

=== Japan ===
- Emu-wēbu, an indoor sporting arena in Nagano

== Ships ==
- Emu (ferry), an Australian ferry later named Brightside, 1865–1908
- HMAS Emu, Australian tugboat launched in 1946
- Emu (ship), multiple ships

== Technology ==
- EmuTOS, an Atari ST operating system
- E-mu Emulator, a digital music keyboard

== Other uses ==
- Emu (journal) (published since 1901), peer-reviewed scientific journal of BirdLife Australia
- Emu Lehtinen (1947–2017), Finnish record dealer
- Penrith Emus Rugby, western Sydney, Australia
- Emu, palm wine in the (Nigerian) Yoruba language

== See also ==
- EMU (disambiguation), as an acronym
- Imu, a traditional Hawaiian cooking method
- Emu and the jabiru, an Aboriginal myth
- Emu oil, a medicinal oil
- Emu War, to cull emus in Western Australia in 1932
