= HM Colonial brig Kangaroo (1812) =

History

United Kingdom
- Name: Kangaroo
- Owner: Transport Board
- Builder: Bideford
- Launched: 1811, or 1812
- Fate: Sold 1818

General characteristics
- Type: Brig
- Tons burthen: 200, or 203, or 204, or 210 (bm)
- Propulsion: Sail
- Complement: 50
- Armament: 12 × 9-pounder guns & 18-pounder carronades

HM Colonial brig Kangaroo (or HM hired brig, or HM armed brig), was a brig built at Bideford, England in 1811 or 1812. She belonged to the British Royal Navy's Transport Board and was based at Port Jackson. There she made voyages for the colonial government along the east coast of Australia with goods and troops. She made one voyage to Ceylon for merchandise and transporting military convicts from Ceylon to Australia. She returned to England in 1817 and the Navy sold her in 1818.

== Career ==
Governor Lachlan Macquarie on 30 April 1810 requested the British Government supply the colony with two brigs (colonial ships) that would not be subject to the control of the Admiralty. The British government provided Kangaroo and Emu. The American privateer Holkar, captained by J. Rolland, captured Emu in 1812 on her outward-bound voyage.

Lieutenant Charles Jefferys (or Jeffreys), received a letter of marque on 1 March 1813. Kangaroo arrived in Sydney on 10 January 1814 after a passage of seven months and eight days from England.

On 28 February 1814 Kangaroo took off the last inhabitants of Norfolk Island.

Then in May–June she carried 40 male convicts and 60 female convicts to Van Diemen's Land. The female convicts were being transshipped from Catherine, which had arrived at Port Jackson on 4 May.

She made one voyage to Ceylon, still under Jeffries' command, leaving on 19 April 1815 and arriving at Colombo Roads on 24 July. She was carrying troops of the 73rd Regiment of Foot and their families. She returned with merchandise, passengers and a number of military convicts, arriving in Sydney on 7 February 1816.

On 14 April 1816 Kangaroo again carried 40 male and 60 female convicts to Van Diemen's Land.

On 5 August 1816 Kangaroo left Port Jackson with 50 male convicts each to Port Dalrymple Hobart.

Governor Lachlan Macquarie sent Kangaroo back to England after he determined that she was unsuitable for the colony. She left on 9 April 1817. Amongst her passengers were the Maori chiefs Tītore and Tui (also known as Tuhi or Tupaea. They visited Professor Samuel Lee at Cambridge University and assisted him in the preparation of a grammar and vocabulary of Māori, which was published in 1820 as the First Grammar and Vocabulary of the New Zealand Language.

== Fate ==
The "Principal Officers and Commissioners of His Majesty's Navy" offered the "Kangaroo brig, of 203 tons", "lying at Deptford", for sale on 13 August 1818.
