= Xemu =

Xemu may refer to:

- Xenu, also known as Xemu, a figure in Scientology beliefs
- Xemu (comics), a Marvel Comics supervillain
- Xemu (emulator), an emulator of the original Xbox gaming console
- NASA's Exploration Extravehicular Mobility Unit, also known as xEMU
- Xemu Records, a U.S. independent record label

== See also ==
- Ax-EMU (Axiom Extravehicular Mobility Unit), an EVA spacesuit for Axiom Space, styled by Prada
- Emu (disambiguation)
- Semu
- Zemu (disambiguation)
