= EMU =

EMU, as an initialism, may refer to:

== Science and technology ==
- Electric multiple unit, a type of train design
  - Electric multiple unit (Queensland Rail)
- Electromagnetic unit, in the centimetre–gram–second system
- English Metric Unit, used in Office Open XML
- Enhanced mini-USB connector
- Evolutionary Map of the Universe, a radio-astronomical survey
- Extravehicular Mobility Unit, a NASA space suit
- EMU (speech database system), software to create, manipulate and analyze speech databases; see X-SAMPA § Summary

== Universities ==
- Eastern Mediterranean University, North Cyprus
- Eastern Mennonite University, United States
- Eastern Michigan University, United States
- Estonian University of Life Sciences (Eesti Maaülikool), Estonia

== Other organizations ==
- Economic and monetary union
  - Economic and Monetary Union of the European Union
- Evangelical Members within the Uniting Church in Australia
- Experimental Military Unit, a US/Australian helicopter force

== Other uses ==
- Ee.Ma.Yau., a 2018 Indian film
- Encyclopedia of Modern Ukraine
- Erb Memorial Union at the University of Oregon, US
- Early Middle Ukrainian, an aspect of the Ruthenian language from the 15th to the mid-16th century

== See also ==
- Emu (disambiguation)
- EMU Australia, a brand of footwear
