= PS Brighton (1882) =

Australian ferry

Coordinates: 32.6684°S 152.1259°E

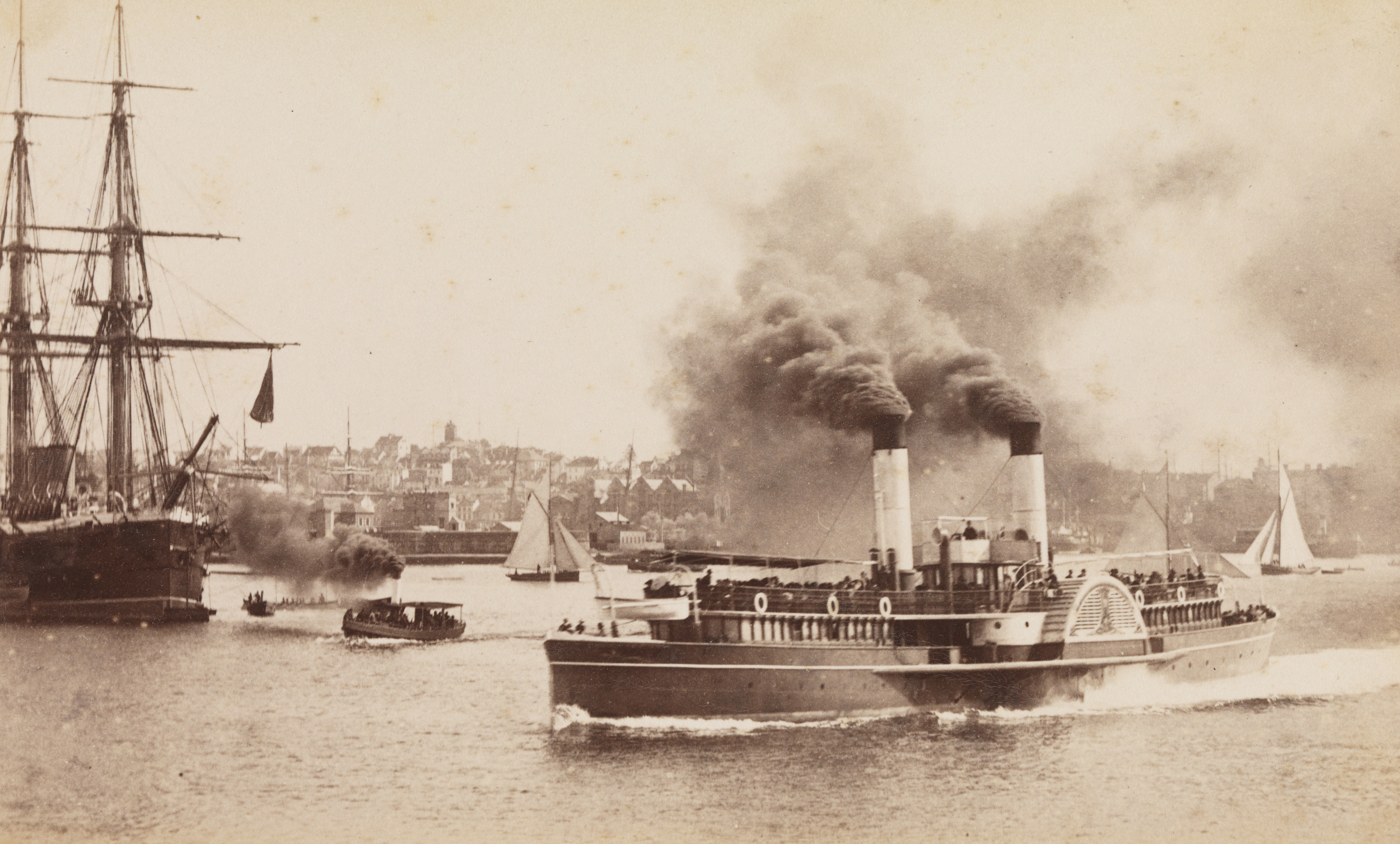

History
- Name: Brighton
- Builder: T.B. Seath & Co. Rutherglen
- Launched: 15 December 1882
- Completed: 1883
- Identification: Official number: 83792
- Fate: Abandoned

General characteristics
- Type: Ferry
- Tonnage: 417 gross register tons
- Length: 220.2 feet (67.1 m)
- Beam: 23 feet (7.0 m)
- Draught: 10.7 feet (3.3 m)

PS Brighton was a ferry used on the Sydney to Manly run. The biggest Manly ferry at the time and the largest paddle steamer to operate on Sydney Harbour, she was well-appointed and popular with passengers.

== Background ==
In the late 1800s, the Manly to Circular Quay (Sydney) ferry service was growing, and the Port Jackson Steamboat Company was expanding. In 1878, the double-ended Fairlight was ordered from England and tug-ferry Commodore soon followed.

Following an 1881 name change to Port Jackson Steamship Company, the Brighton was ordered.

== Design and construction ==
The ship was constructed by T.B. Seath & Co. of Rutherglen, Scotland in 1883. She was said to be a copy of the Primrose and Daisy which ran on the River Mersey, England.

Her paddle wheels were driven by two A. Campbell & Son compound diagonal oscillating steam engines generating 160 hp and then 230 hp in the 1890s. She could reach a speed of 15 knots. She had a summer capacity of 1,137 passengers - as many as the modern manly ferries - and 885 in winter.

She set out from Scotland for Sydney on 2 June 1883. Near Colombo, large waves crashed over the stern and ran the full length of the decks ripping out fittings including seats. She ran aground on several occasions and lack of wind rendered her auxiliary sails useless on the voyage. Steaming down the Australian coast, the crew had to burn planking and cabin doors to keep a head of steam after almost running out of fuel close to her destination. She arrived in Sydney on 1 September 1883. At 67 metres in length, she was as long as the present day Manly ferries.

With velvet coloured seats, singing canaries in cages, and polished brass-work and timber, she was popular with passengers.

== Service history ==
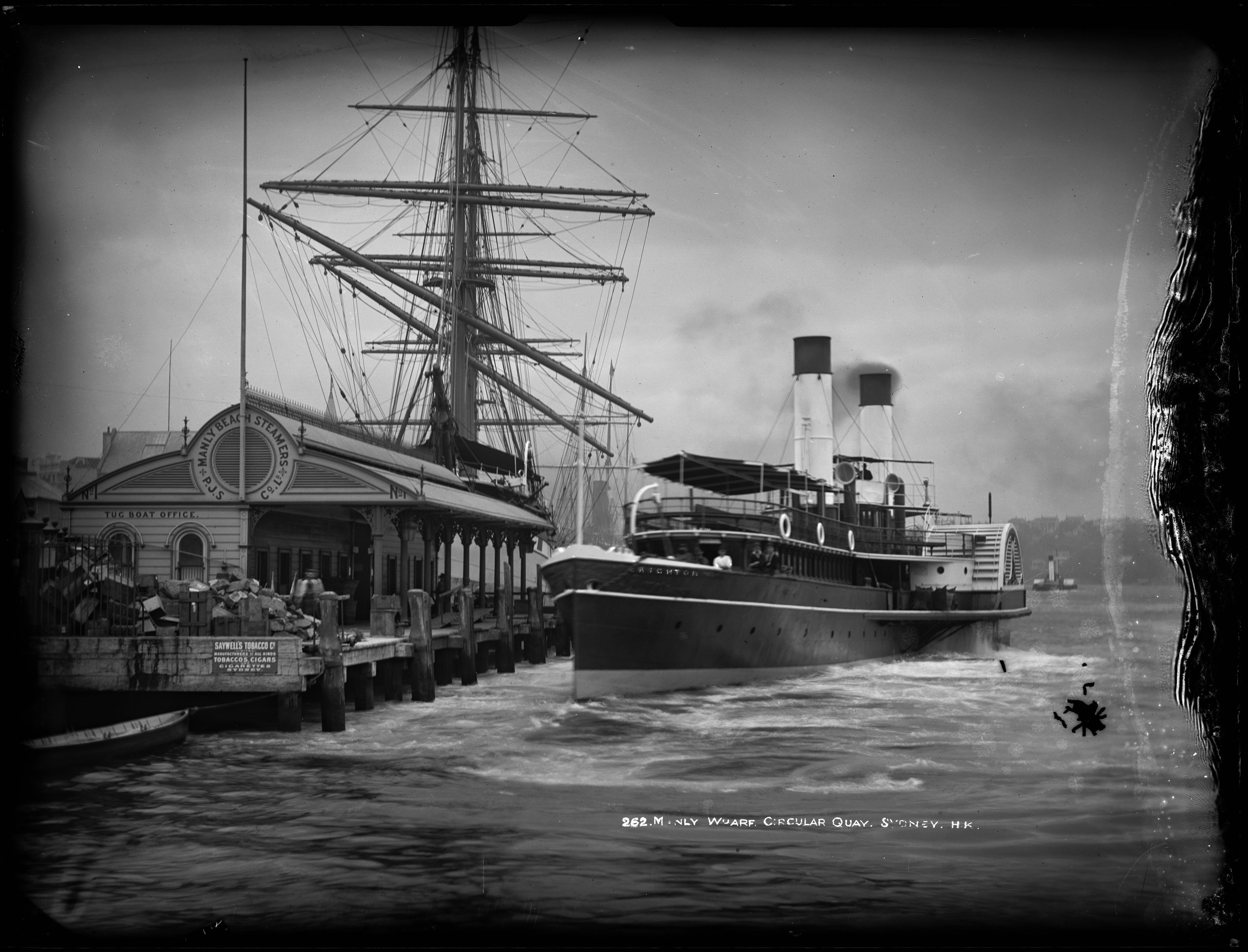
Brighton at Circular Quay after her wheelhouse was closed in

She worked alongside passenger vessels Brightside (formerly Emu), Fairlight and the tug/ferries Port Jackson, Irresistible, Commodore and Mystery. She was the last paddle steamer on the Manly run.

In 1896 Marius Sestier made a film of Passengers Alighting from Ferry Brighton at Manly the first film shot and screened in Australia.

In January 1898, near Bradley's Head, the coastal steamer Dunmore was struck on her rails by the side paddle box of Brighton. Neither vessel sustained serious damage.

On her way to Manly from Circular Quay on 7 August 1900, Brighton collided with the collier Brunner off Chowder Bay. Brunner's bow wedged into the side of Brighton. Brunner proceeded to Kirribilli Point and Brighton's passengers were transferred to Manly ferry Narrabeen. Brighton was taking on water and to avoid sinking, Brighton's master drove it onto the beach at Chowder Bay. The stern of the ferry flooded as the tide rose around the aground vessel. Damage to Brunner was minor and it quickly returned to service. Brighton however took three months to repair before re-entering service in November.

She was hulked in 1916 and used as a storeship for timber exporters in Port Stephens. Her hull lies abandoned in The Duckhole at Port Stephens.

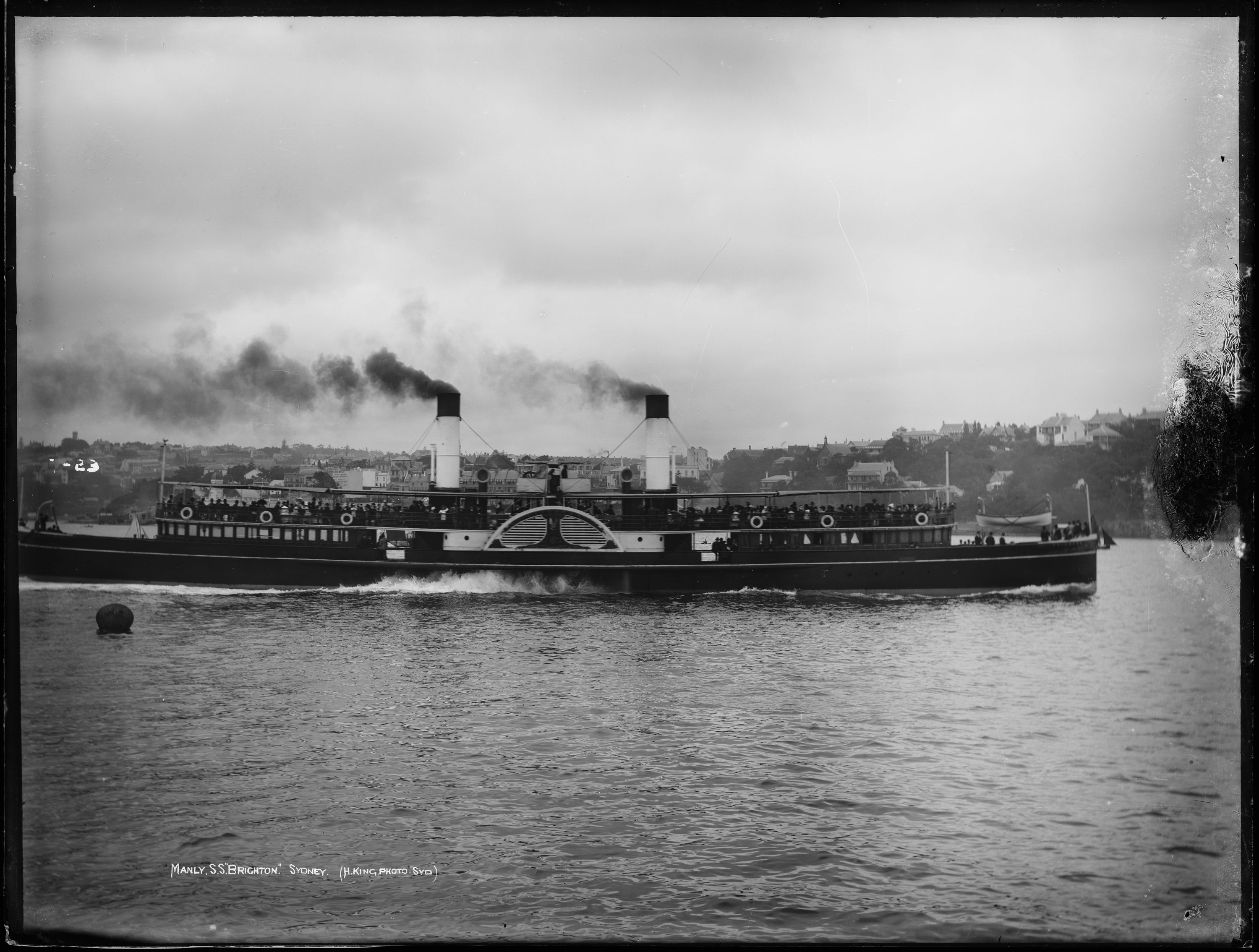
on Sydney Harbour (circa 1884 - 1895) prior to her wheelhouse being closed in

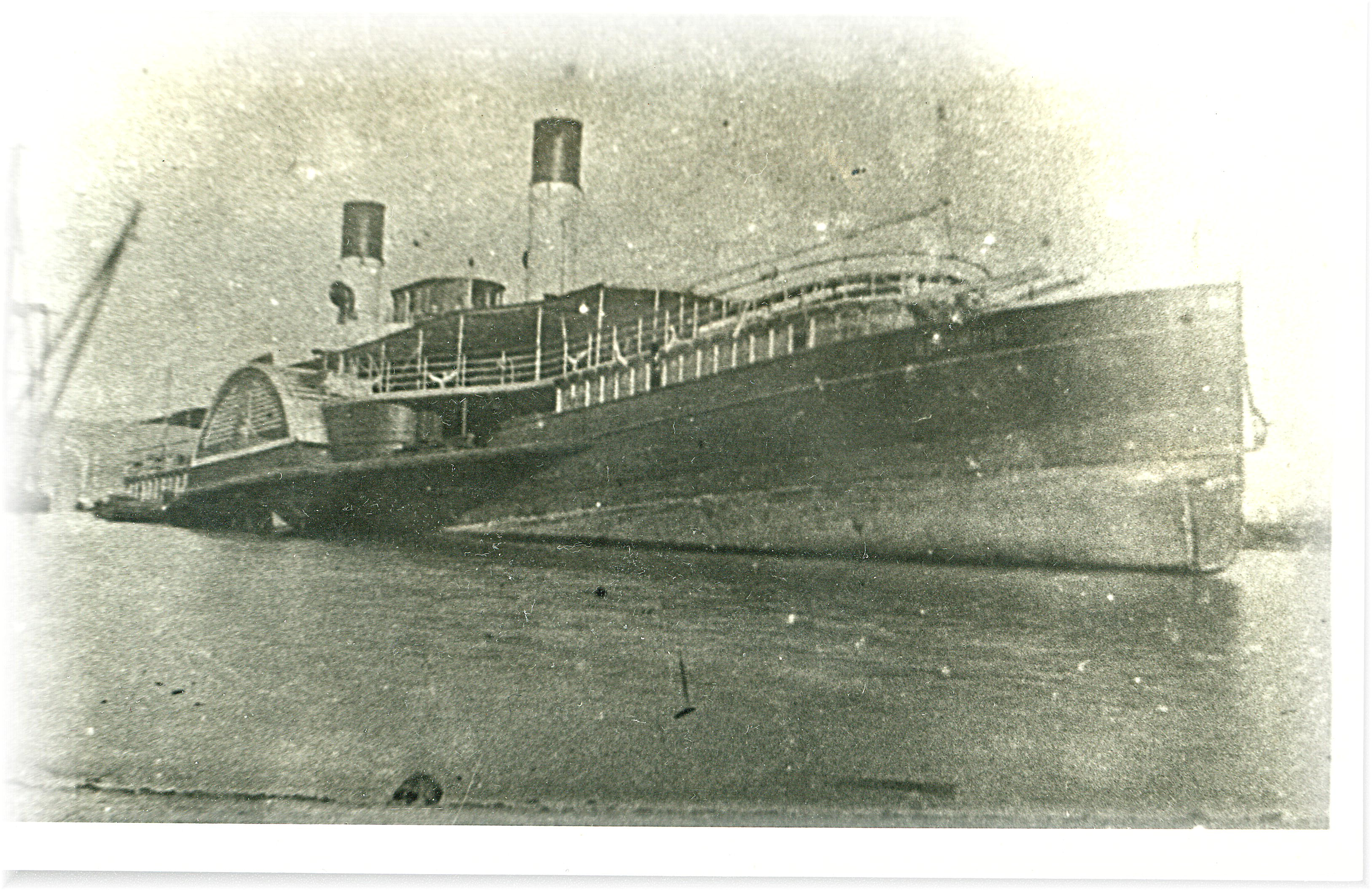
aground at Clifton Gardens after collision, August 1900

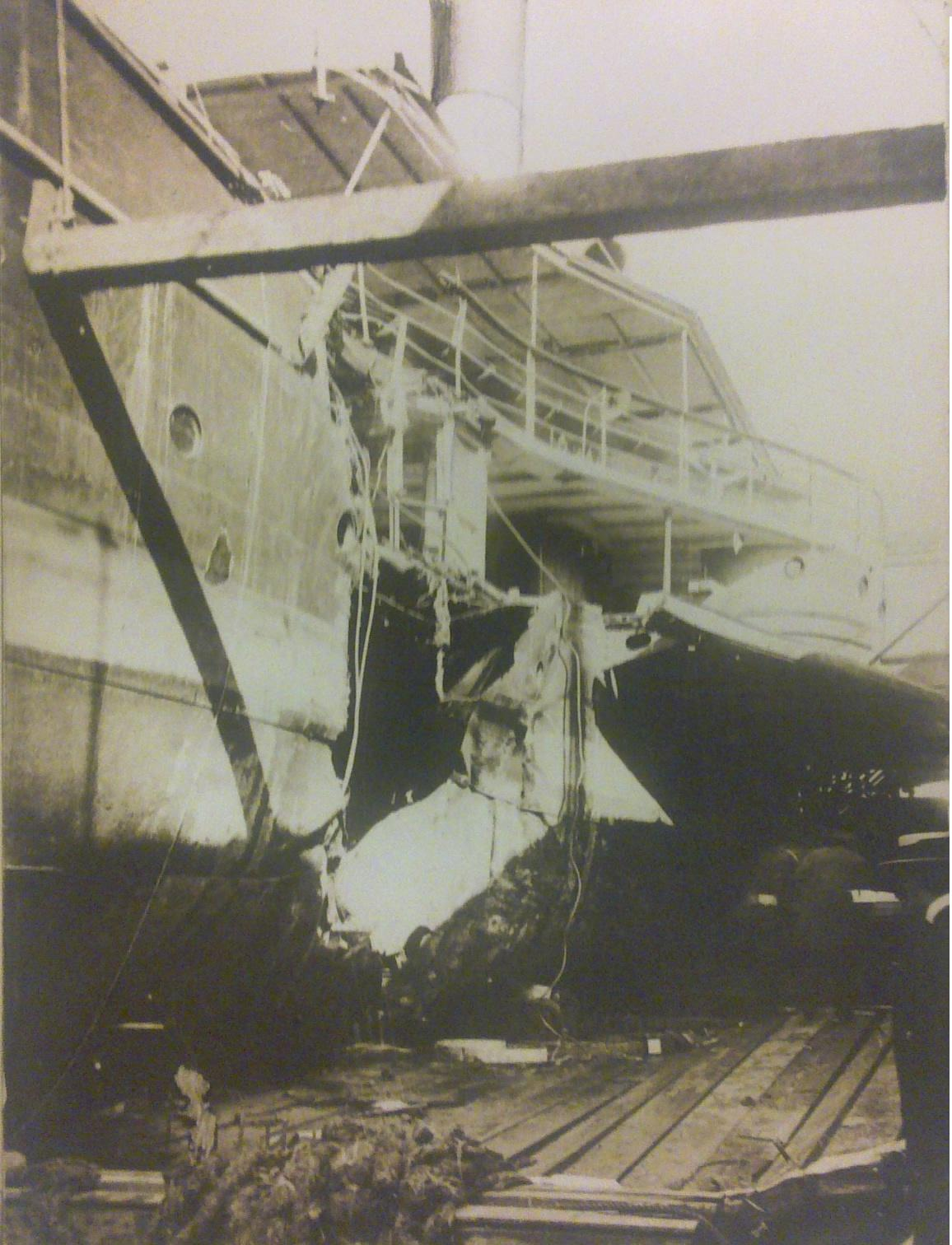
Collision damage to paddle boxes, August 1900

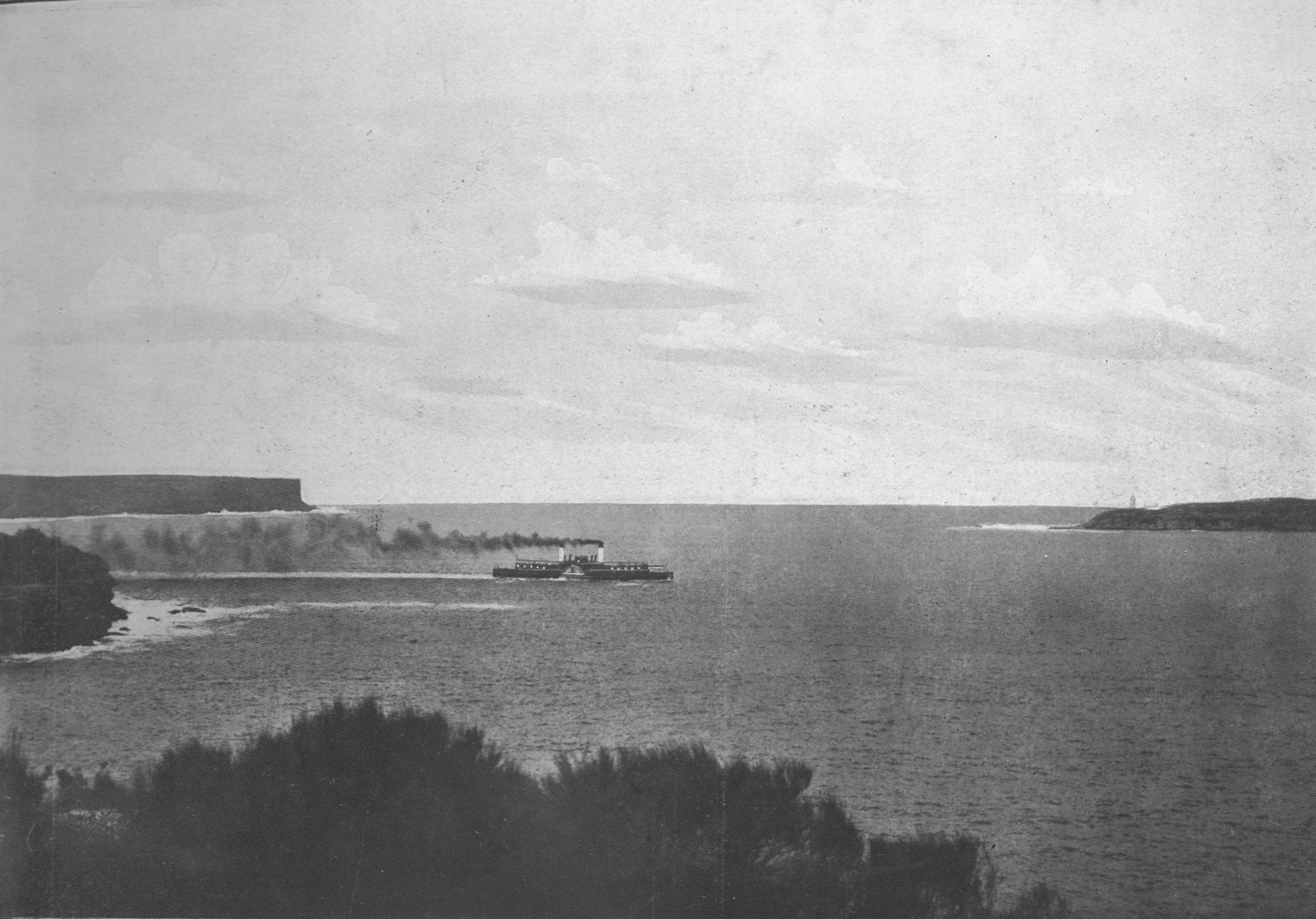
Crossing Sydney Heads, ca 1900

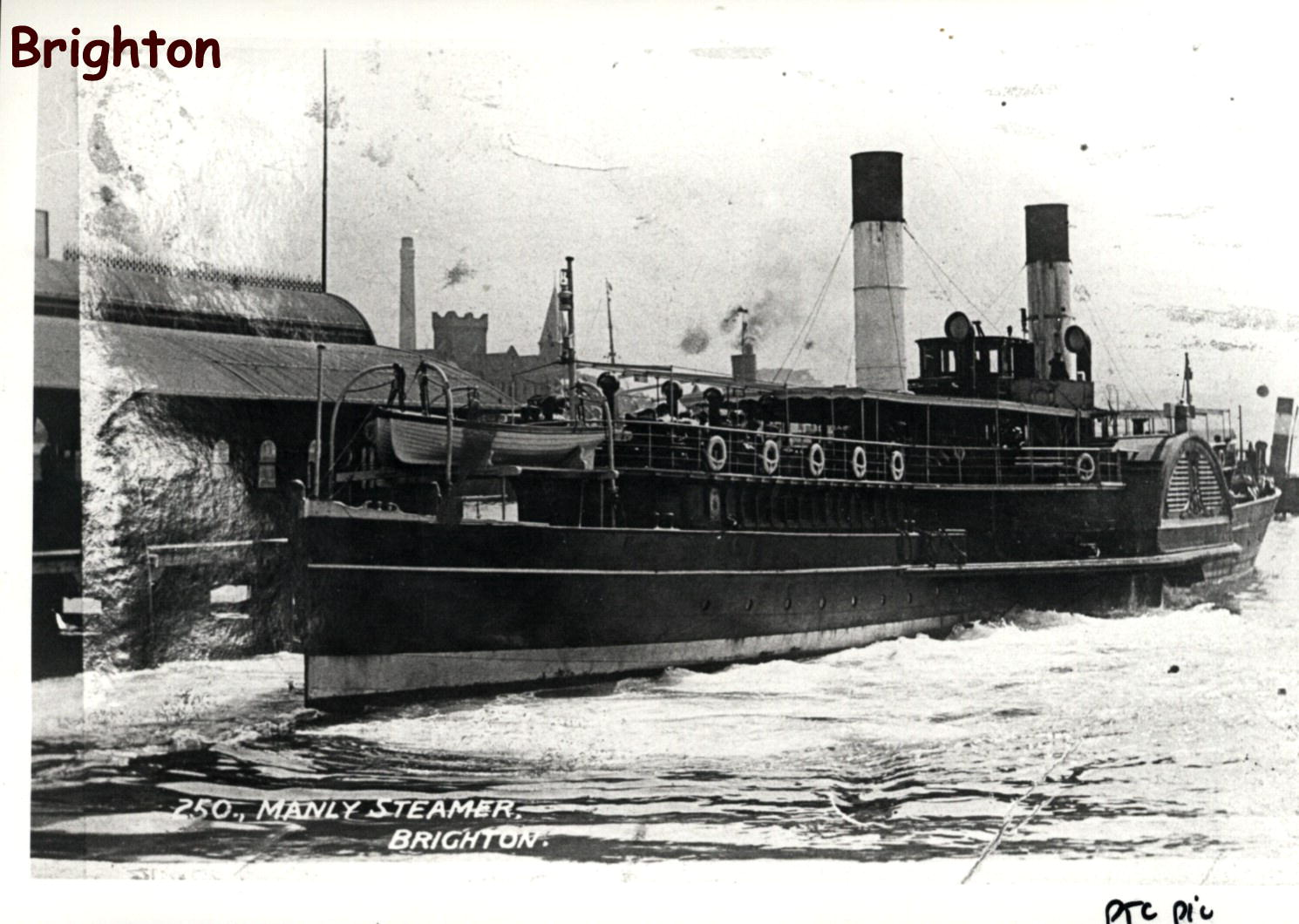
leaving Circular Quay in her final years in ferry service, 1912

== See also ==
- List of Sydney Harbour ferries
- Timeline of Sydney Harbour ferries
