= Narrabeen (1886 ferry) =

Australian steamer ferry

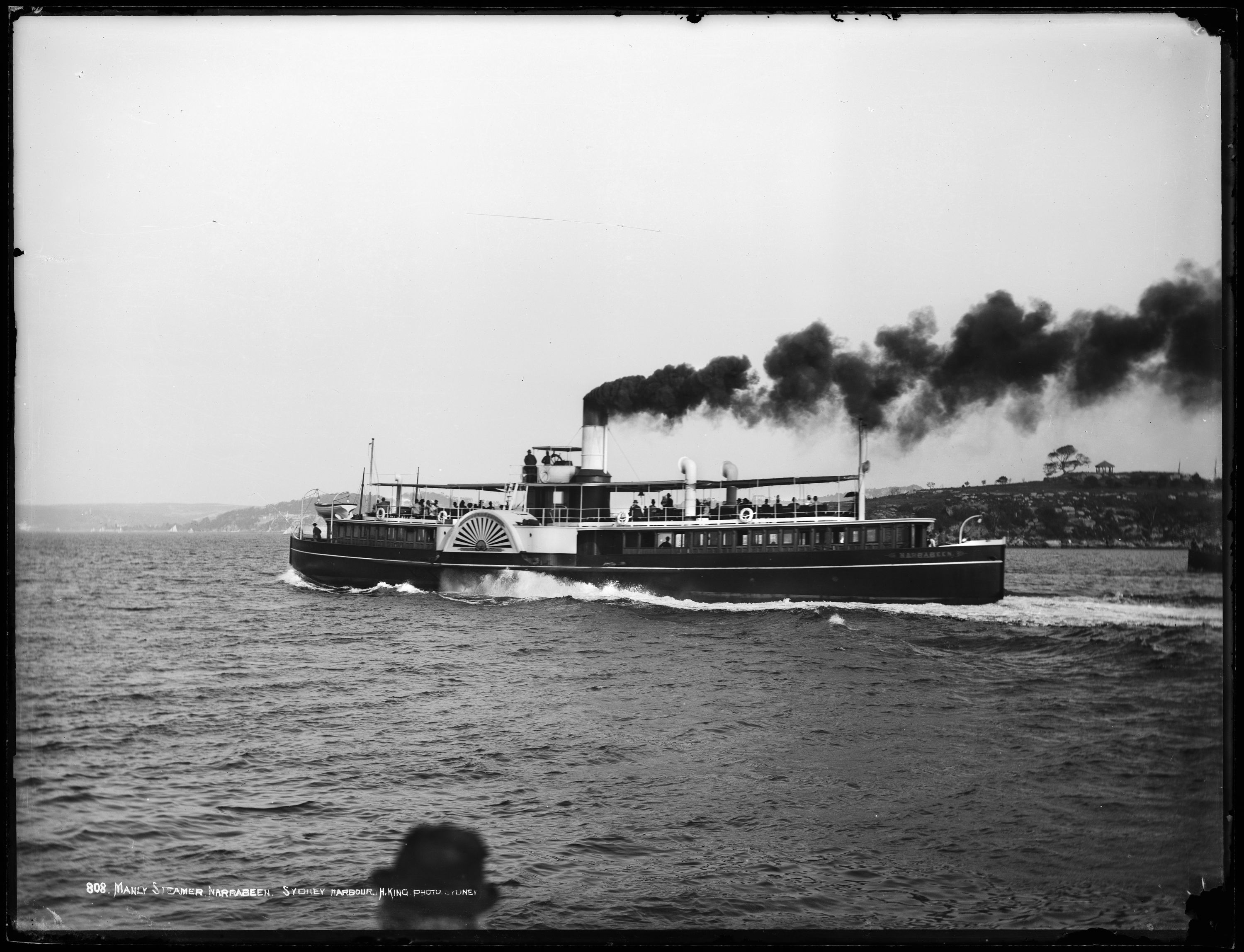
- en route to Manly with her original open wheelhouse

History
- Name: Narrabeen
- Namesake: Sydney suburb, Narrabeen
- Operator: Port Jackson Steamship Company
- Port of registry: Sydney
- Builder: Mort's Dock
- Launched: 1886
- Out of service: 1911 converted to cargo vessel, 1917 hulked
- Fate: Unknown

General characteristics
- Type: Ferry
- Tonnage: 239 tonnes
- Length: 48.8 m (160 ft 1 in)
- Beam: 6.7 m (22 ft 0 in)
- Propulsion: 65 hp (48 kW) compound steam engine
- Speed: 13 knots (24 km/h; 15 mph)
- Capacity: 850 (approx)

Narrabeen was a paddle steamer ferry on Sydney Harbour that ran on the Circular Quay to Manly route.

== Name ==
She was named after the Sydney suburb of Narrabeen, one of the first ferries to be named after localities on Sydney's northern beaches. This would become a naming tradition for Manly ferries that continued through to contemporary ferries.

She was the first of three Manly ferries to be named Narrabeen. The last Manly cargo vessel, Narrabeen (II), was built in 1921, sold in 1928 to the Westernport Bay Shipping Company and wrecked in 1958. Narrabeen (III) was commissioned in 1984 as the third of four Freshwater-class ferries, the four of which remain in service.

== Design and construction ==
She was built in 1886 by Mort's Dock and Engineering for the Port Jackson Steamship Company. An iron-hulled vessel, Narrabeen was 48.8 metres (160 ft 1 in) long, 239 tons (211 tons from 1911) and could carry up to 850 passengers. Her 65 horsepower (48 kW) compound steam engines (supplied by Mort's Dock) could push her to 13 knots (24 km/h; 15 mph).

== Service history ==
Originally built with an open wheelhouse, it was later glassed in to offer more protection to the master and helmsman. Smaller and of lower passenger capacity than her contemporary Brighton (1883), she was used on off-peak services to Manly. With the introduction of the larger Bingarra class, she was modified in 1911 for use as a cargo ferry with derricks fitted at either end. She was hulked about 1917 and her fate after this is unknown.

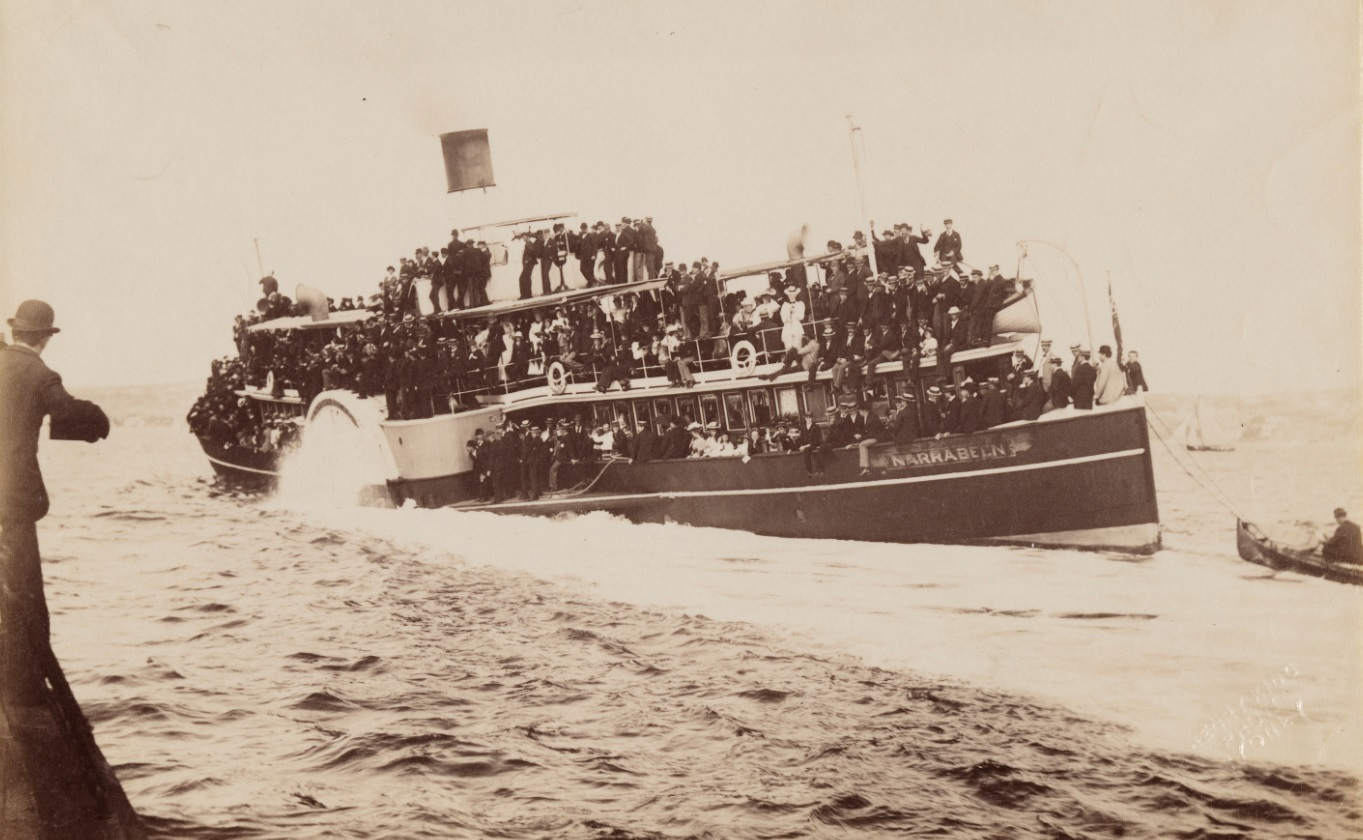
A lightly loaded Narrabeen, 1890s

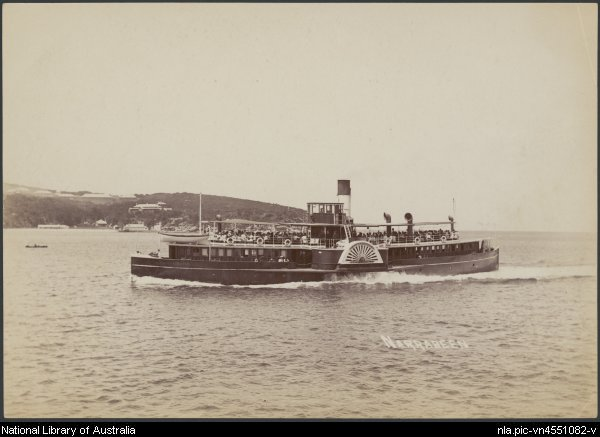
After her open wheelhouse was glazed in

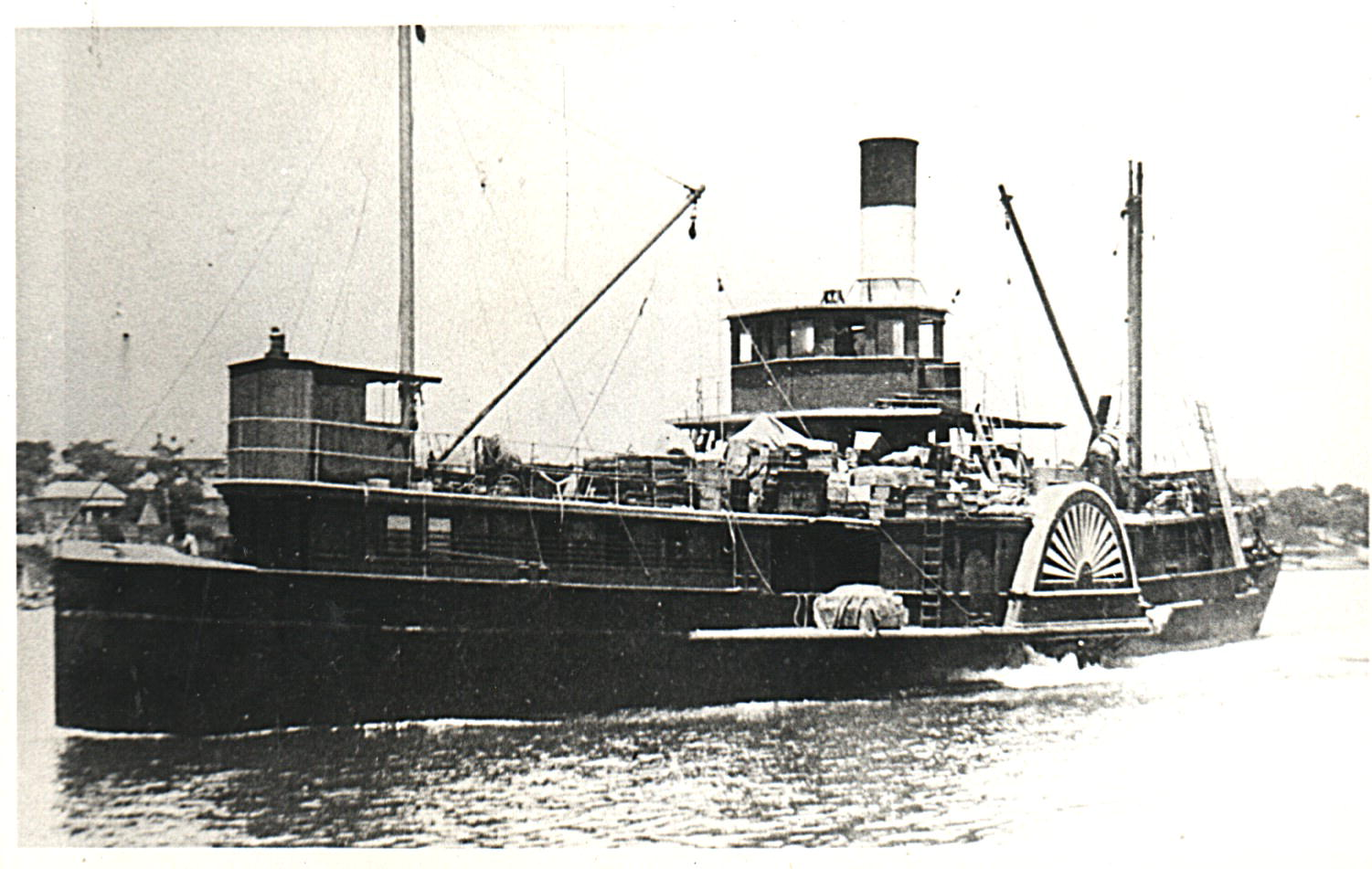
Following her 1911 conversion to a cargo ferry.

== See also ==
- List of Sydney Harbour ferries
