= Enhanced mini-USB =

Type of hybrid electrical connector

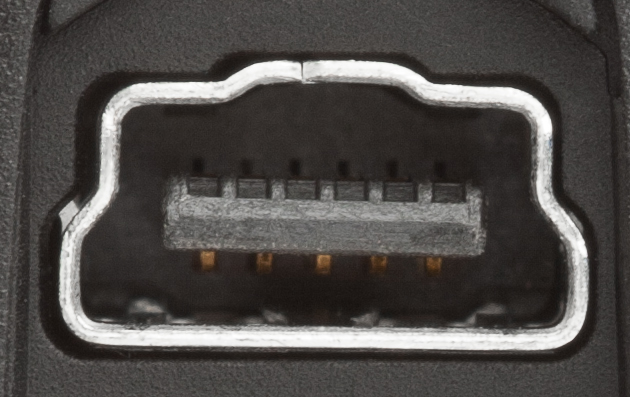
Mini-USB socket with additional pins and notch on Canon camera

An enhanced mini-USB (EMU) connector is a type of hybrid electrical connector which carries Universal Serial Bus data and power as well as other connections such as bidirectional audio. It was invented for and is mainly used on mobile phones. Motorola, HTC Corporation, and other mobile phone manufacturers use EMU connectors. There is more than one standard for EMU connectors, which are incompatible between manufacturers, but all are physically and electrically compatible with standard mini-USB connectors. The EMU connector has five pins for USB on one side. While regular USB connectors are empty on the other side, EMU has more pins intended for headsets. In HTC's version, two pins are for the microphone, three are for stereo sound, and one is for the push-to-talk switch.

In the CEA-936-A standard, there are no extra pins — the USB data pins are also used for RS-232 transmit and receive, stereo audio left and right, or for microphone and speaker/earpiece. Devices select which function the pins perform depending on user settings or on the context or mode in which the device is being operated. Two different functions cannot be used at once.

Using the connector may require a breakout cable or special headset. Most often, the user must buy a special adapter or pigtail to make the correct connections to a 2.5 mm TRS connector for a monophonic headset or 3.5 mm for stereo headphones. True breakout cables which provide all connections are unavailable, thus a phone cannot be charged at the same time as a headset or headphones are inserted, even for EMUs with extra pins.

Some mobile phone companies have used the extra pin "X" to enforce the use of their own battery chargers. Verizon Wireless is the first company to require first-party battery chargers, having colluded with Motorola to put an arbitrary 1.4 volts on pin X. This voltage violates the USB-IF standards, as pin X should either be tied to ground or not connected at all. Without this connection, the phone will refuse to charge, displaying "unauthorized charger" despite receiving the proper current. The phone will charge while connected to a personal computer only if the PC is running a special device driver.

Extra pins in hybrid mini-USB connectors are used as non-standard compliant way to provide USB 3.0 SuperSpeed connectivity as alternative to standard SuperSpeed micro-B and USB-C connectors.
