= Zemu =

Zemu may refer to:

- Zemu Gap Peak, in the Himalayas
- Zemu Glacier, in the Himalayas
- ZEMU, an acronym for Zero-Emission Multiple Unit, a type of hydrogen train

== See also ==
- Zemus, a character of the Final Fantasy IV series
- Xemu (disambiguation)
