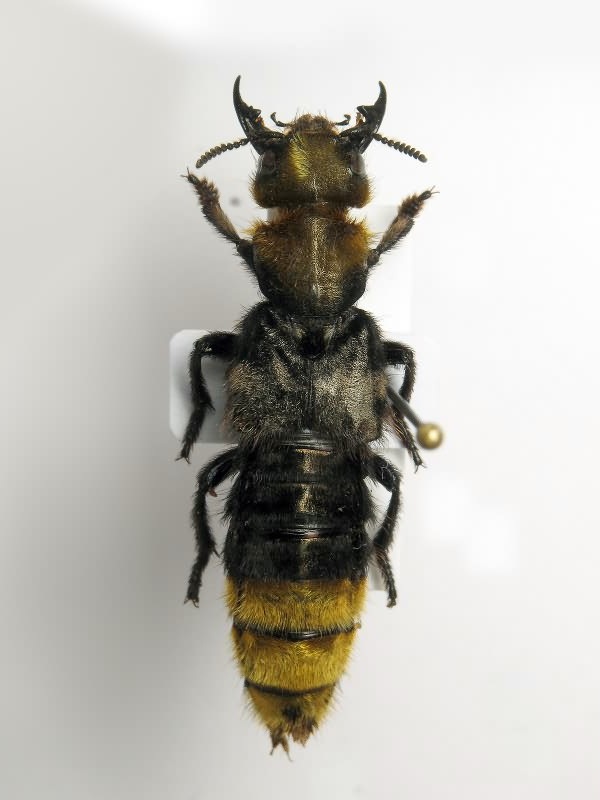

Scientific classification
- Kingdom: Animalia
- Phylum: Arthropoda
- Class: Insecta
- Order: Coleoptera
- Suborder: Polyphaga
- Infraorder: Staphyliniformia
- Family: Staphylinidae
- Genus: Emus
- Species: E. hirtus

Binomial name
- Emus hirtus (Linnaeus, 1758)

= Emus hirtus =

Species of beetle

Emus hirtus is a species of rove beetles native to Southern and Central Europe. They are attracted to cattle and horse manure, as well as carrion, as they prefer to hunt insects that feed on the material.
