= Emu bush =

The name Emu bush is a common name for several species of plants in Australia:

- Several species of the genus Eremophila
- Hakea laurina, endemic to Western Australia
