= Emu (ship) =

Several ships have been named Emu for the emu:

- Emu (1812 ship) was a merchant ship built at Liverpool that transported convicts to Australia. An American privateer captured her in 1812 as she was carrying female convicts to Van Diemen's Land.
- Emu (1813 ship) (sometimes "His Majesty's armed brig Emu", was a merchant ship built at Dartmouth in 1813. The British government engaged her to go out to New South Wales to serve the colony there. She spent about a year transporting people and supplies between New South Wales and then the colonial government sent her back to England in 1816. On her way she stopped at the Cape Colony where she was wrecked in 1817.
- Emu (1837), of 29310/94 tons (bm), was a barque built by Wigram's, of Blackwall, London, for their own account for use in the Australia trade. Wigram's sold her in 1857. Last listed in Lloyd's Register in 1869.
- Emu (1847), a 2-masted wooden schooner built in Leschenault, Bunbury, Western Australia, in 1847; wrecked 29 or 30 April 1853 off Port Elliot, South Australia
- Emu (1849), a barque of 306 tons (bm), registered in Tasmania in 1849 where she was employed in whaling.
- Emu (ferry), an Australian ferry later named Brightside, 1865–1908
- HMAS Emu, Australian tugboat launched in 1946
