= CEA-936-A =

CEA-936-A (USB Carkit Specification) is a Consumer Electronics Association (CEA) standard to allow the use of a mini or micro USB connector for UART and analog audio signals. It is intended to allow connection of a mobile phone to analog hands-free car kits, chargers, and other RS-232 devices. It does not comply with the USB specification.

From the mobile phone side, the USB D− wire is used as either the USB D− signal, the UART Transmit data signal, the left stereo speaker audio channel, or the mono speaker audio channel, and the USB D+ wire is used as either the USB D+ signal, the UART Receive data signal, the right stereo speaker audio channel, or the mono microphone audio channel.

The carkit specification also finds optional support in ULPI specification for off chip USB Physical layer ICs.
