= Emu (ferry) =

Australian paddle steamer ferry

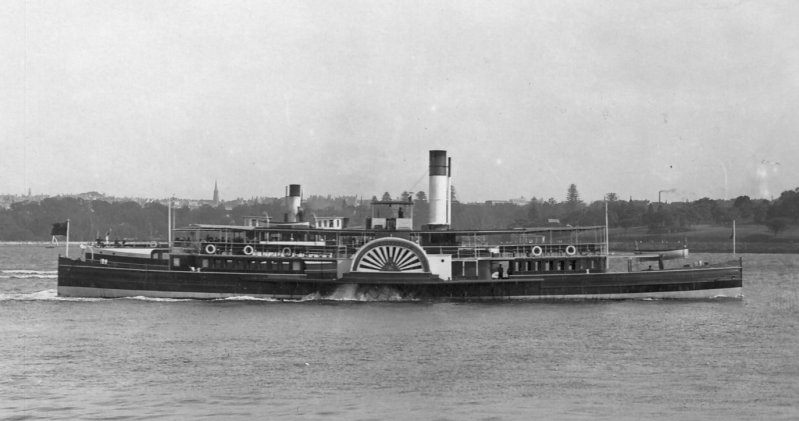
- Brightside approaching Circular Quay, Sydney

History
- Name: 1865: Emu; 1887: Brightside
- Owner: 1865: Queensland SN Co; 1868: Australasian SN Co; 1877: Port Jackson Steam Boat Co; 1881: Port Jackson Steamship Co; 1898: Port Jackson Co-operative SS Co; 1907: Port Jackson & Manly SS Co
- Port of registry: 1865: Brisbane; 1868: Melbourne; 1868: Sydney
- Builder: A. & J. Inglis, Glasgow
- Yard number: 12
- Launched: March 1864 in Scotland; 5 August 1865 in Queensland
- Completed: 1865
- Out of service: 1902 converted to cargo ship
- Identification: UK official number 52221
- Fate: Burnt out 1908, scrapped 1909

General characteristics
- Type: passenger ferry
- Tonnage: 270 GRT, 212 NRT
- Length: 170.8 ft (52.1 m)
- Beam: 22.1 ft (6.7 m)
- Draught: 5.1 ft (1.6 m)
- Installed power: 70 NHP
- Propulsion: 2 × inverted diagonal steam engines
- Speed: 10 knots (19 km/h)
- Capacity: 800 passengers

Emu, later Brightside, was an iron-hulled paddle steamer that was built in Scotland in 1864 for using in Australia. For her first few years, she worked on the Brisbane River and Moreton Bay. From 1868, she was a local ferry in Sydney Harbour. From 1902, she was a cargo ship. She was scrapped in Sydney in 1909.

== Building ==
A. & J. Inglis built Emu in Pointhouse, Glasgow, launching her in March 1864. She was then dismantled and transported as a "knock-down ship" to be reassembled in Australia. The steamship Platypus brought her in sections from Scotland to Queensland, where she was reassembled at Kangaroo Point, Brisbane. She was re-launched on 5 August 1865.

Emu's registered length was 170.8 ft (52.1 m), her beam was 22.1 ft (6.7 m) and her draught was 5.1 ft (1.6 m). Her tonnages were 270 GRT and 212 NRT. She had a pair of two-cylinder inverted diagonal steam engines, which between them were rated at 70 NHP. She was a double-ended craft, with at rudder at each end. She was capable of 10 knots (19 km/h).

== Career ==
Emu's first owner was the Queensland Steam Navigation Company, which registered her in Brisbane. She worked on the Brisbane River and Moreton Bay.

In 1868, the Australasian Steam Navigation Company (ASNC) acquired Emu, registered her in Melbourne and operated her on Port Phillip. Later that year, the ASNC moved her to Sydney and re-registered her.

From January 1877, the Port Jackson & Manly Steamship Company operated her on Sydney Harbour on the Manly route alongside the ferries PS Brighton, Sydney's biggest paddle steamer, and Fairlight. In 1887, the company renamed her Brightside. In June 1897, she sank at Neutral Bay. Later on, she was raised, and returned to service that year. In 1902, she was converted into a cargo ship. She continued working on the Manly route until 1908 when she was gutted by fire. Her hull was converted to a lighter, but in 1909, she was scrapped. Her engines were used in a sawmill.

== See also ==
- List of Sydney Harbour ferries
- Timeline of Sydney Harbour ferries
