= Emu and the Jabiru =

Emu and the Jabiru is an Australian Aboriginal myth. The myth tells a story of greed between two brothers-in-law, who through their fighting transformed into the first emu and jabiru.

== Narrative ==
The story begins with Gandji and his children fishing for stingray. In clear water, they spear many stingray, and cook them over a fire to separate their meat from the fat, and wrap these in bark. They return from their expedition and offer some of their catch to Gandji's brother-in-law Wurrpan and his children.

Wurrpan discovers that Gandji has kept the highest quality meat for his own family, and the two begin to argue. Gandji says that Wurrpan should catch his own stingray, and throws hot coals into his face. Gandji picks up a rock used for nut grinding and throws it, striking Wurrpan in the chest.

In fear of what Wurrpan will do in retaliation, Gandji begins jumping around, and then flying about, higher and higher, until he turns into a jabiru without a beak. Wurrpan fetches a spear to throw at the flying Gandji. The spear strikes Gandji in the back of the head and travels through to his face, protruding and forming a beak. Gandji falls from the sky.

Wurrpan and his family turn to flee, turning to emus so that they can run faster. Their feathers are grey, owing to the ash that Gandji threw in Wurrpan's face.
