= Emu apple =

Emu apple is a common name for several species of plants and may refer to:

- Kunzea pomifera, also known as native cranberries
- Owenia acidula, a hallucinogenic plant found in Australia
- Owenia vernicosa, a plant found in Australia
