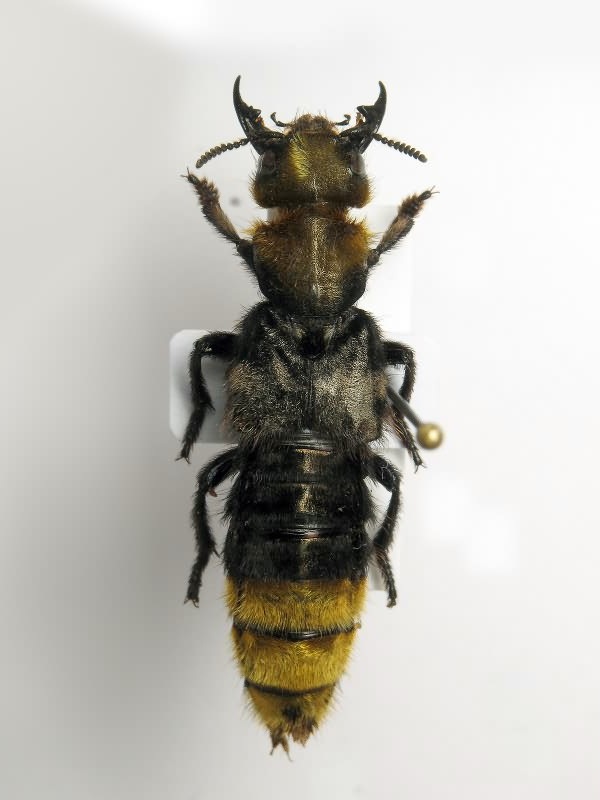
- Emus hirtus

Scientific classification
- Kingdom: Animalia
- Phylum: Arthropoda
- Clade: Pancrustacea
- Class: Insecta
- Order: Coleoptera
- Suborder: Polyphaga
- Infraorder: Staphyliniformia
- Family: Staphylinidae
- Tribe: Staphylinini
- Genus: Emus; Leach, 1819

Type species
- Staphylinus hirtus Linnaeus, 1758

Synonyms
- Emys Agassiz, 1846; Creatophilus Gistel, 1856

= Emus (beetle) =

Genus of beetles

Emus is a genus of rove beetles with long, matte yellow, black, and grey hairs on the pronotum and parts of the abdomen.

== Species ==
The genus contains the following species:

- Emus aeneicollis
- Emus figulus
- Emus hirtus
- Emus soropegus
