= Emu Creek =

Emu Creek is the name of:

== Places ==
- Emu Creek, Queensland, a locality in the Toowoomba Region, Australia
- Emu Creek, Victoria a locality in the City of Greater Bendigo
- Emu Creek Station, a pastoral lease in Western Australia

== Other uses ==
- Emu Creek (Condamine River), a tributary of the Condamine River in Queensland, Australia
- Emu Creek, former name of the Ajax Copper Mine in South Australia

== See also ==
- Aurukun, Queensland#Attractions
