= Fairlight (ferry) =

Australian paddle steamer ferry

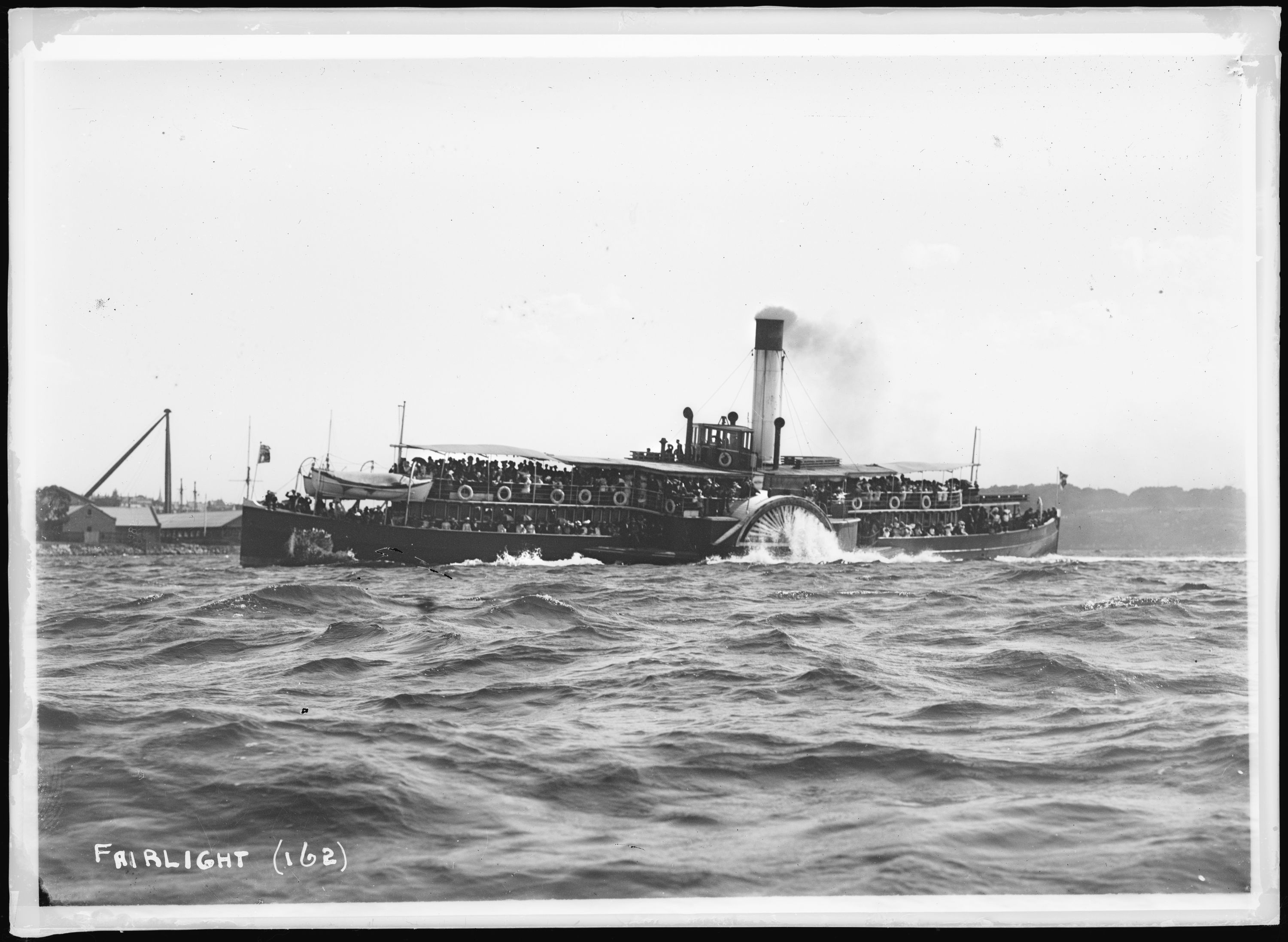
- passing Garden Island en route to Manly

History
- Name: Fairlight
- Port of registry: Sydney
- Cost: £16,000
- In service: 1878
- Out of service: 1914
- Fate: Broken up

General characteristics
- Tonnage: 315 tons
- Length: 52.1
- Capacity: 950

Fairlight was a paddle steamer ferry that operated on the Circular Quay to Manly run from 1878 to 1914. She was the third double-ended steamer on the Manly run and first to be specifically designed for the route.

She was named after Fairlight, a suburb near Manly.

== Design and construction ==
Fairlight was built in Whiteinch, Scotland. She cost £16,000 including delivery, a sum for which the Port Jackson Steamship Company mortgaged itself heavily to pay. At 315 tons, and 52.1 m long, she was iron-hulled with a two-deck timber super-structure.

In Britain, she had been rated for 1,100 passengers, but Sydney surveyors rated her for 950 passengers on account of the large swells across the Sydney Heads. She could make a steady 13 knots. At the time, she was the most well-appointed Manly ferry with cushioned seats, closed in salons and carpeted floors.

== Service history ==
She was sail rigged to augment her modest coal supplies, and steamed to Sydney in fifty-six days. She hit rough seas in the Indian Ocean but was not damaged, and her master praised her seaworthiness. Captain Mickleson was both her delivery master and her first master upon entering service.

She ran a two-boat service for the company.

In December 1882, she ran down a sailing boat with three people aboard near Middle Head. A young boy on the boat received a fractured skull and later died. Fairlight was found to be at fault with insufficient crew on the day to have a lookout posted fore and aft.

Fairlight was converted to a cargo ferry on the Manly run in 1908, and in 1914, she was hulked and her hull towed to Brisbane in 1912 and her new owners converted the hull of the ship into two lighters two years later. Her wreck is a Tangalooma near Moreton Island.

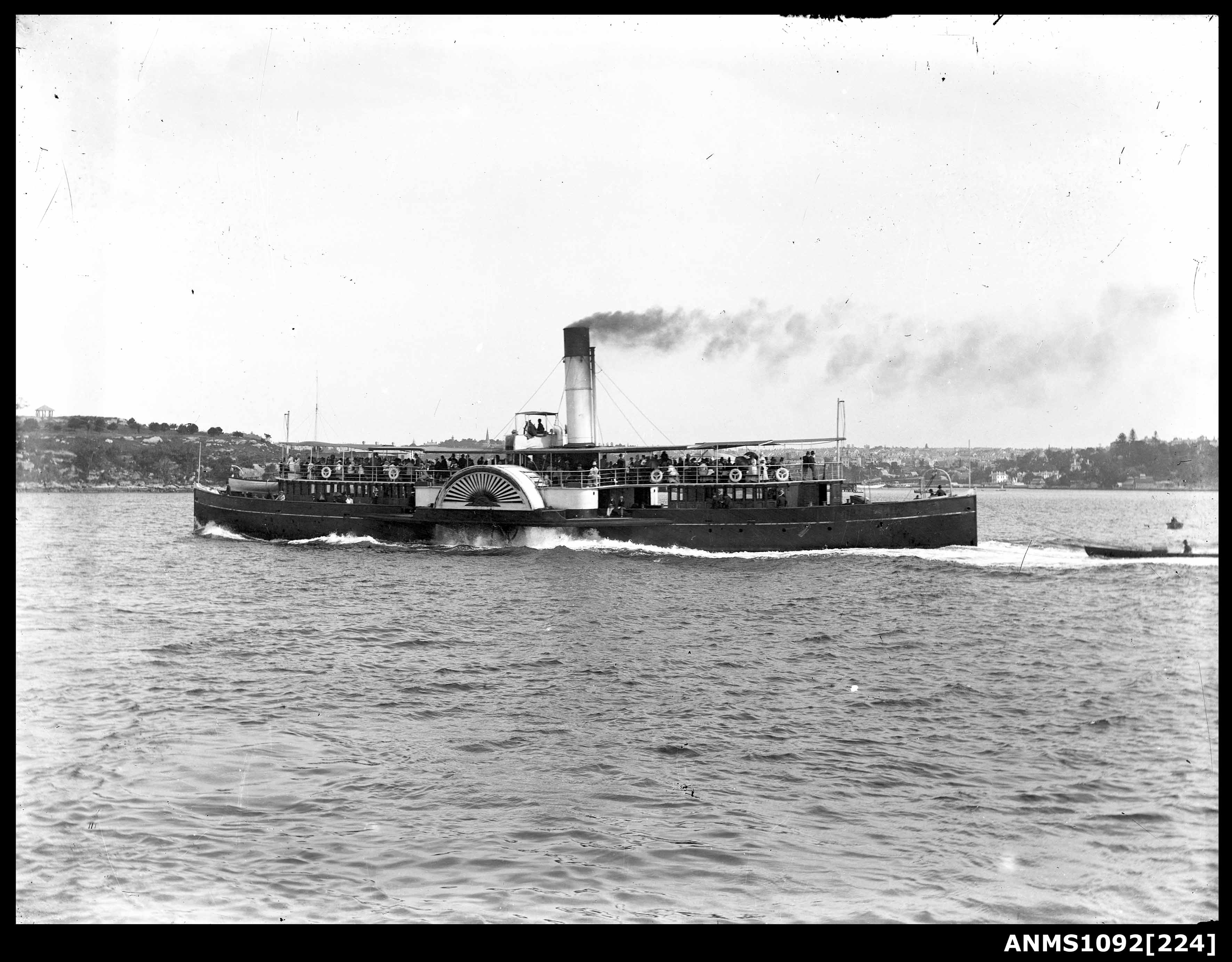
steaming towards Manly, 1890s

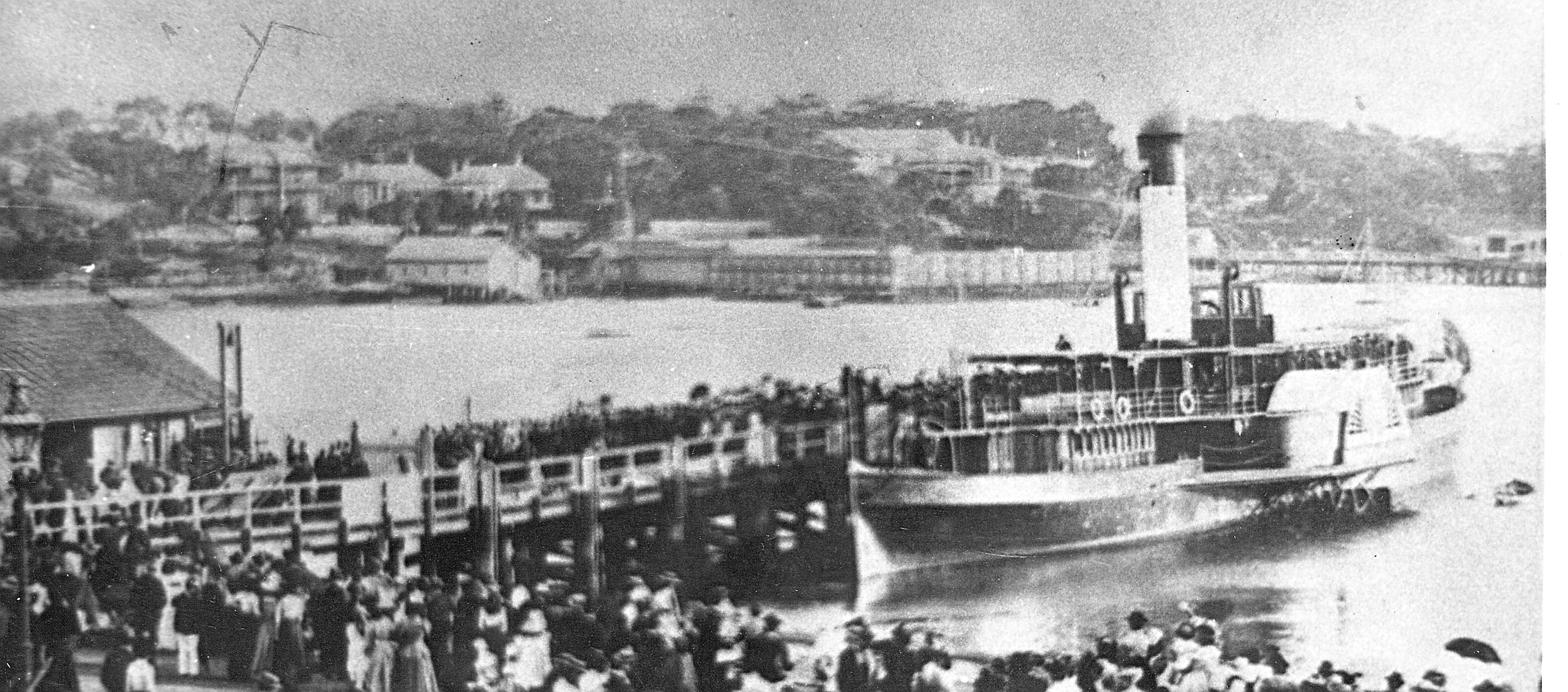
At Manly Wharf

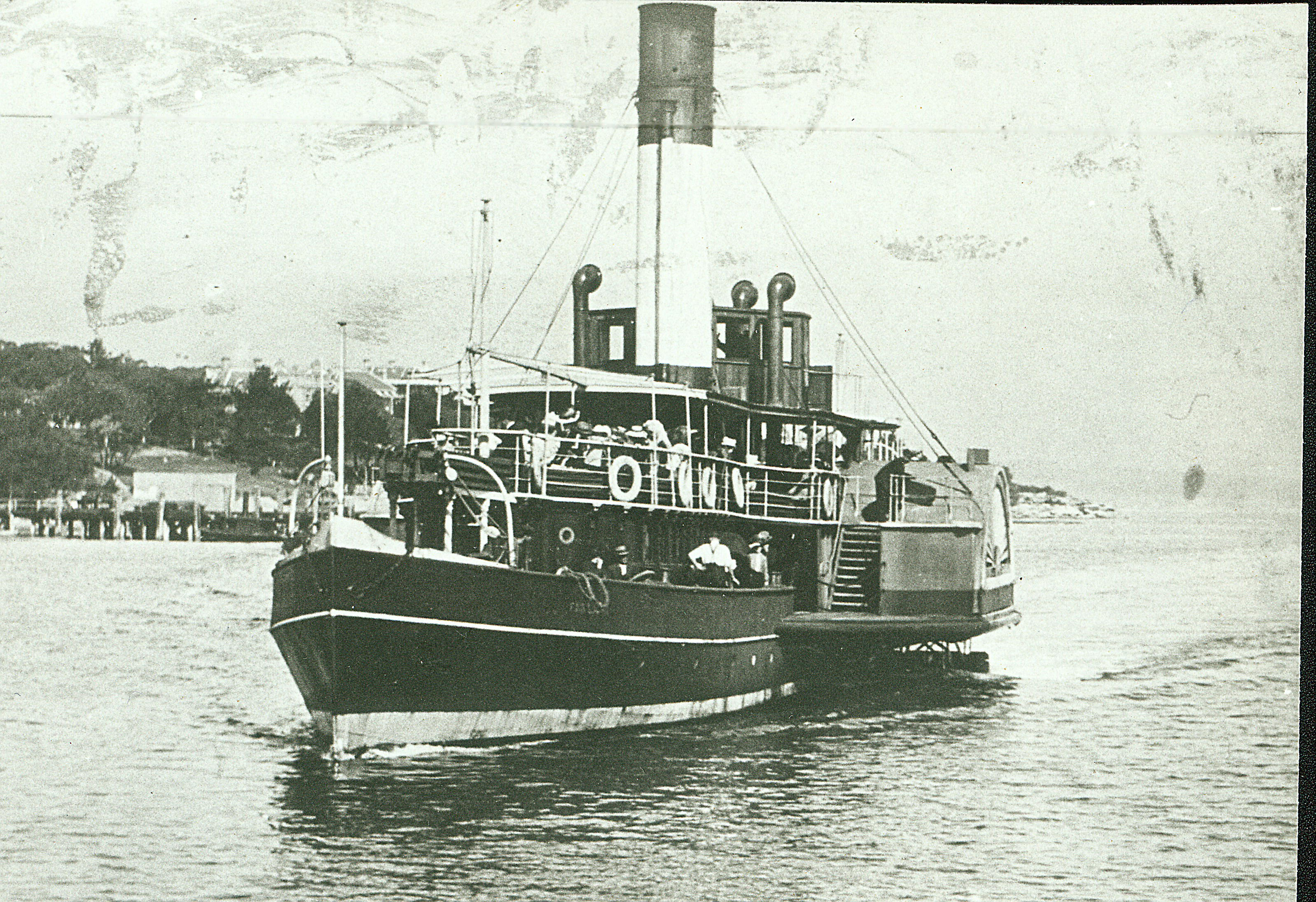
Approaching Manly Wharf, date unknown

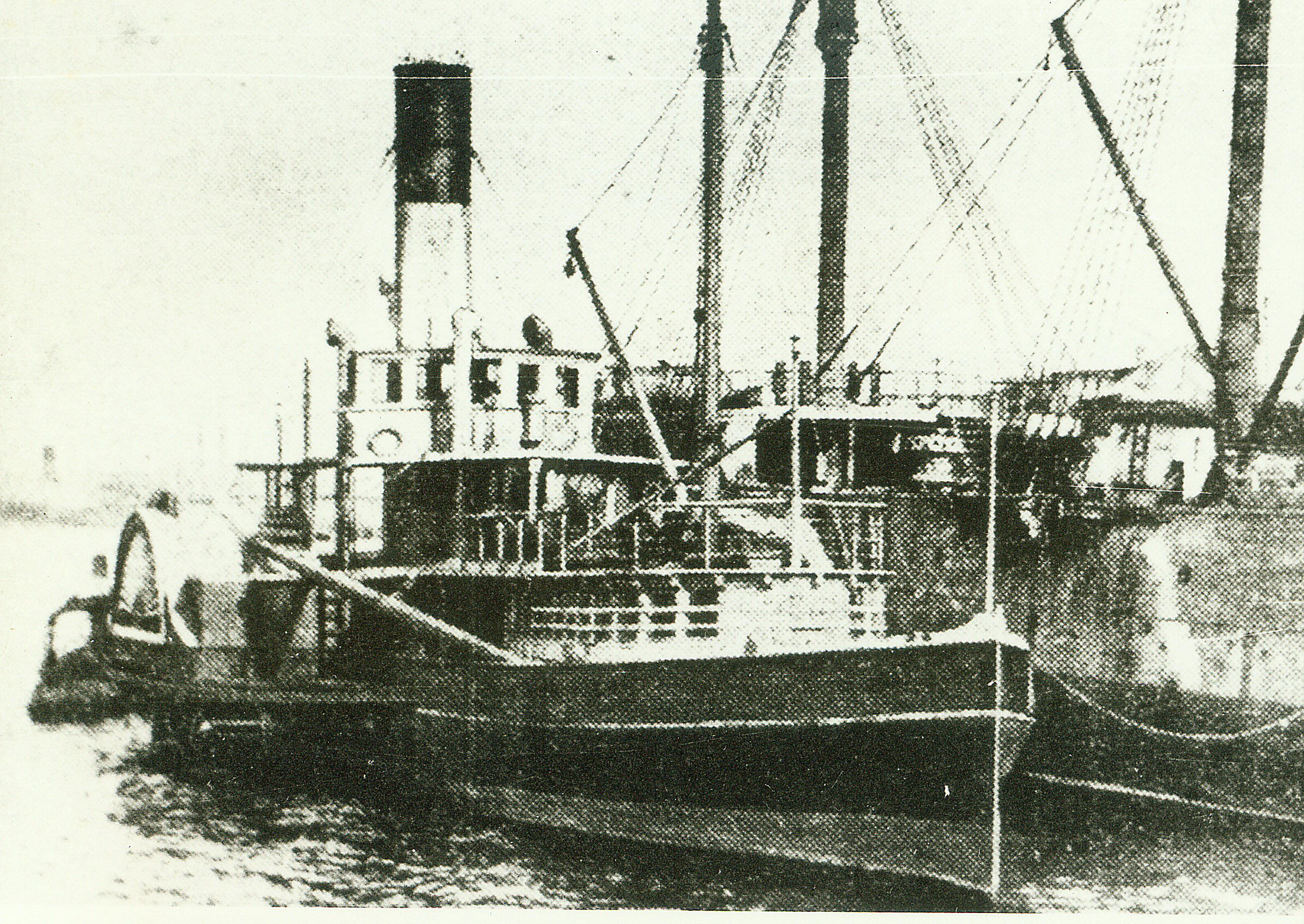
At the breakers yard circa 1912 before hull was sent to Brisbane

== See also ==
- List of Sydney Harbour ferries
- Timeline of Sydney Harbour ferries
