= Greycliffe disaster =

1927 shipping accident in Sydney, Australia

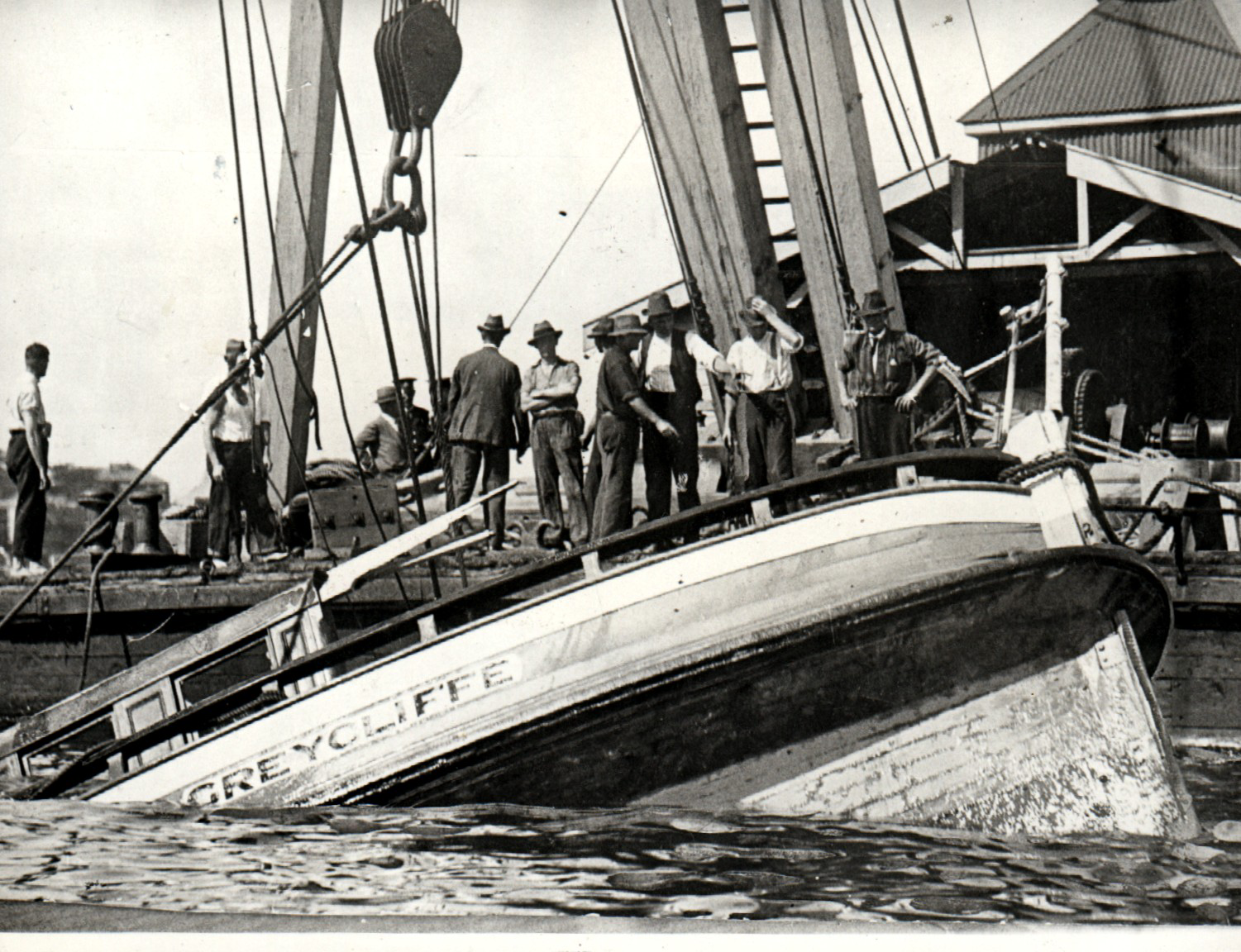
Greycliffe's remains are lifted from the bottom of Sydney Harbour

The Greycliffe disaster occurred in Sydney Harbour (Australia) on 3 November 1927 when the harbour ferry Greycliffe and the Union Steamship Company mail steamer Tahiti collided. The smaller ferry was cut in two and sank, killing 40; it was the deadliest incident on Sydney Harbour.

== The Greycliffe ==
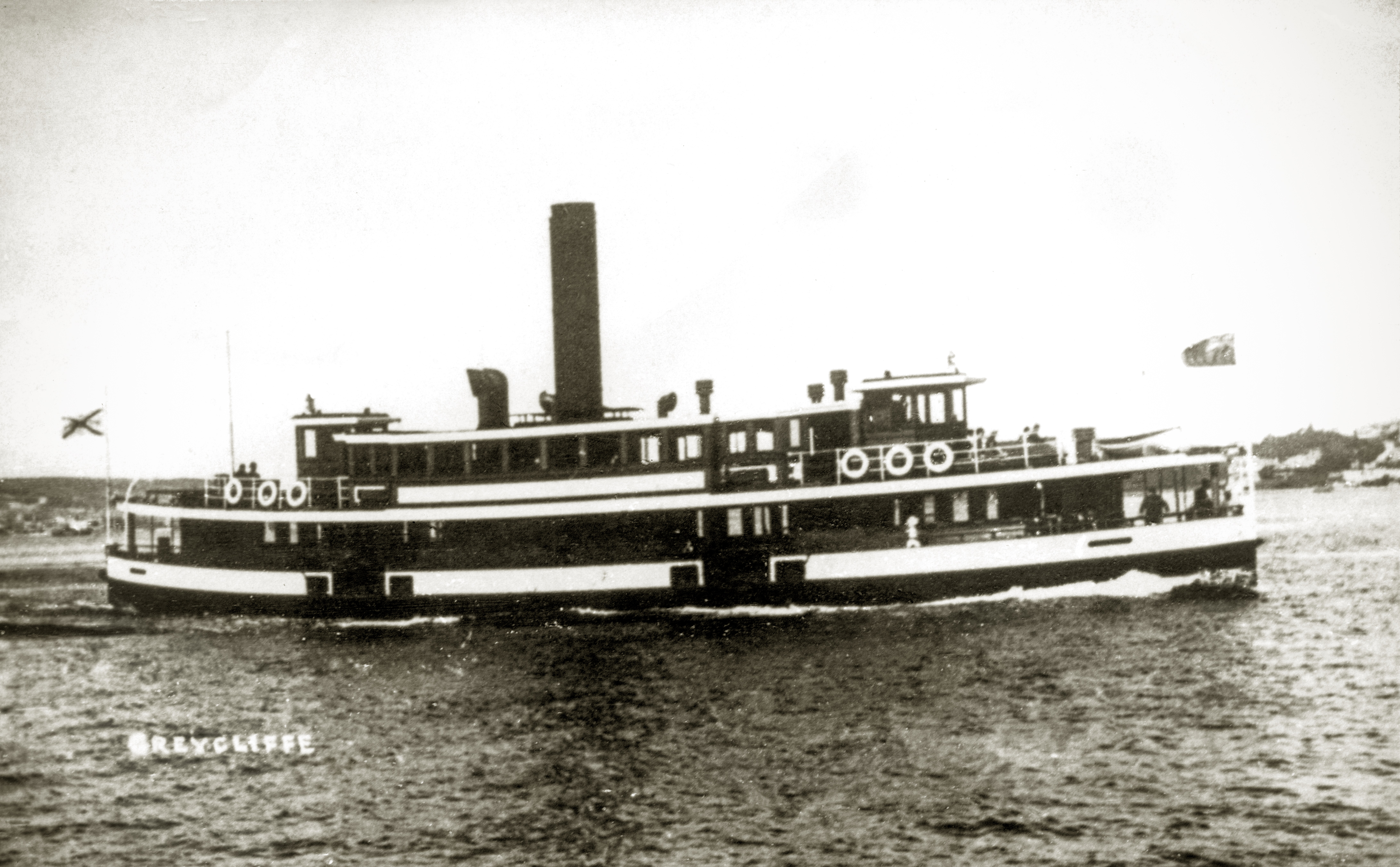
Greycliffe (built 1911) on Sydney Harbour

Greycliffe was a wooden double-ended screw steamship built for the Watsons Bay run. Originally owned by the Watson's Bay and South Shore Ferry Co. Pty. Ltd, she and her running mates, King Edward, Vaucluse and Woollahra, were taken over by Sydney Ferries Limited in 1920.

She was of 133 gross tons, on dimensions of 125.0 feet length between perpendiculars x 24.0 feet beam x 9.9 feet depth of hold. She was built at Balmain, Sydney in 1911 by David Drake. The vessel was powered by a triple-expansion steam engine of 49 nominal horse power made by Campbell & Calderwood that gave a maximum speed of about 12 knots.

A double-ended screw ferry, she had a wheelhouse, rudder and propeller fitted at each end. Weathered white bulwarks ran the length of the vessel at deck level. There were segregated men's and women's saloons on the lower main deck with the men's forward, over the boiler room, and the women's aft over the engine room. Above was an upper promenade deck which also had inside and outside seating. At each end of the upper deck were the wheelhouses.

== The collision ==
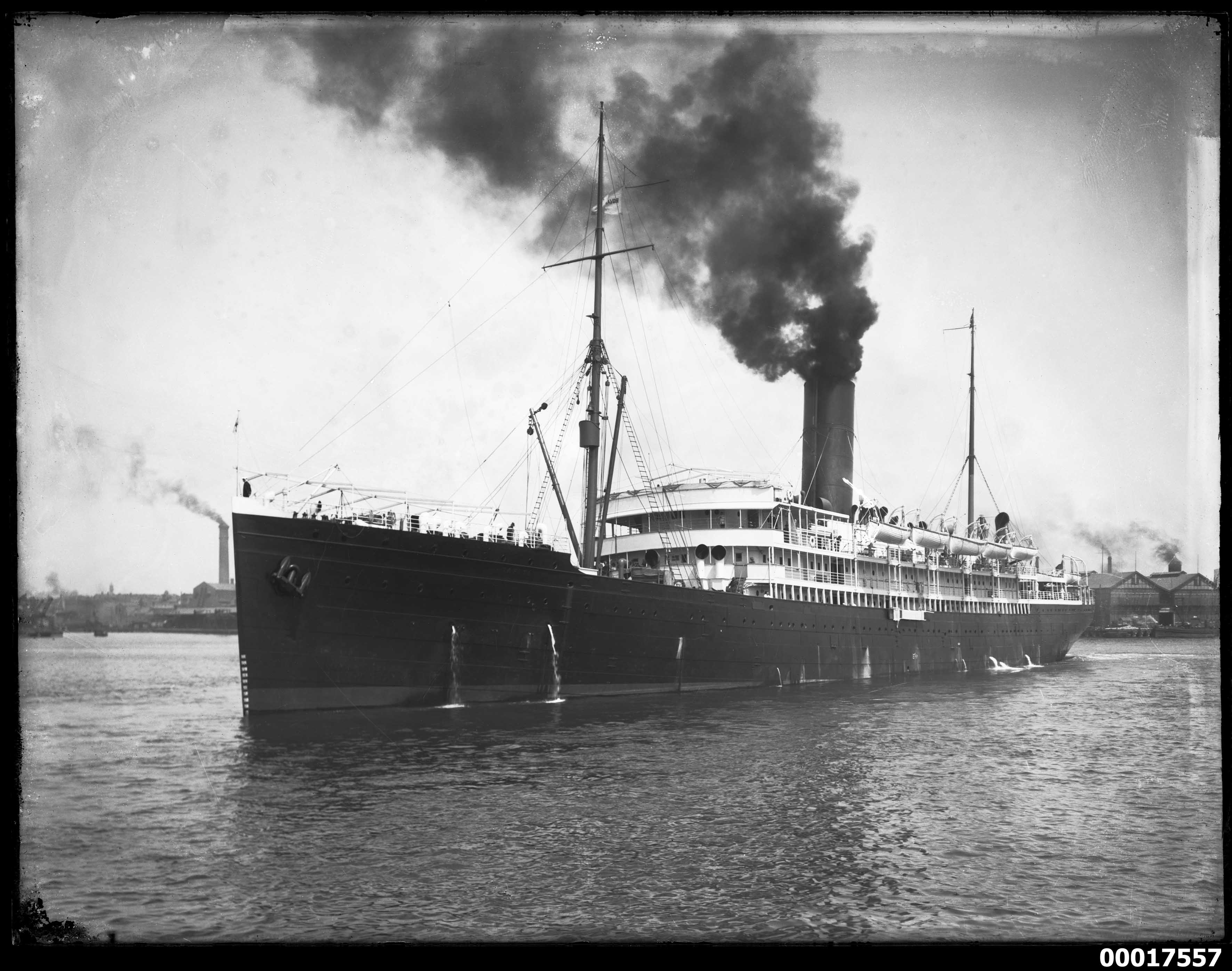
RMS Tahiti on Sydney Harbour, circa 1920

Greycliffe left Circular Quay, Sydney's main ferry terminus, at 4.15pm on Thursday 3 November 1927, with 120 passengers on board, including many schoolchildren returning home. The ferry stopped at Garden Island to pick up dock workers, and then resumed its journey on a course that would have taken it just north of the lighthouse near Shark Island. Its remaining intended stops were to be Nielsen Park, Parsley Bay, Central Wharf (near The Crescent), and Watsons Bay. On roughly the same course, however, was the liner operated by the Union Steamship Company of New Zealand's outward-bound transpacific Royal Mail Ship, the 7,585-ton RMS Tahiti, three times the length of Greycliffe. Greycliffe was ahead and to starboard of Tahiti.

At about half-way between Garden Island and Bradleys Head, Tahiti's bows struck Greycliffe midships on her port side. The small ferry was pushed around perpendicular to the large steamer's bow, and momentarily was pushed along. The ferry began to overturn, and was broken in two, and the steamer sailed through the ferry, which sank immediately. Passengers who were sitting outside had a better chance of escape, while those inside the two cabins—a ladies-only saloon, and a smoking room for men—were trapped. A number of other boats on the harbour witnessed the collision and rescued survivors from the water.

== Rescue and recovery ==
Several days later, smashed hull sections were towed to Whiting Beach near Taronga Zoo and divers looked for missing bodies. Seven of the forty killed were under the age of twenty, including a two-year-old boy who died along with his grandparents. Most of the victims came from the ferry's intended destination, Watsons Bay. Among the other victims was Millicent Bryant, who had become the first Australian woman to hold a pilot's license a few months earlier.

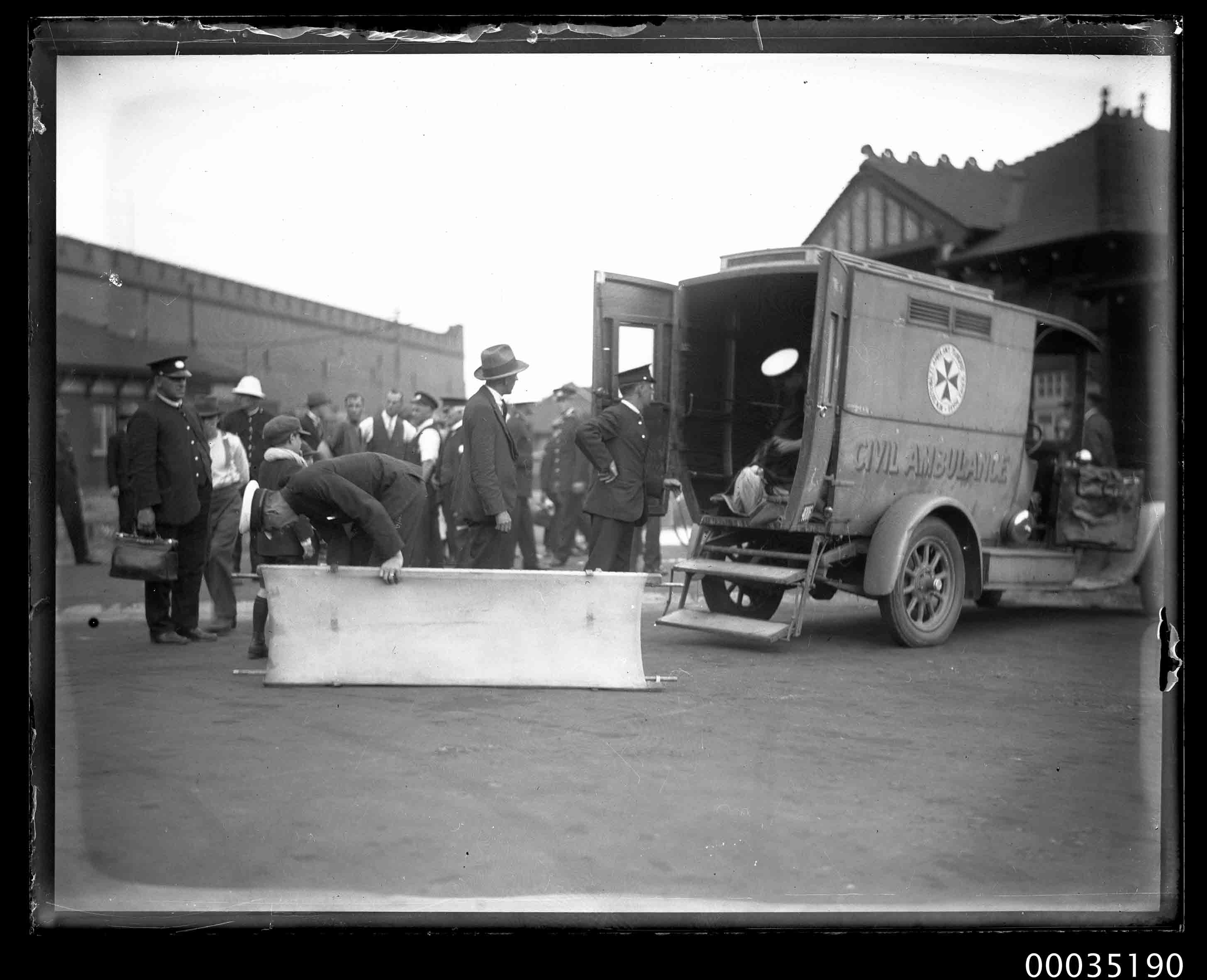
Ambulance at Fort Macquarie following the accident

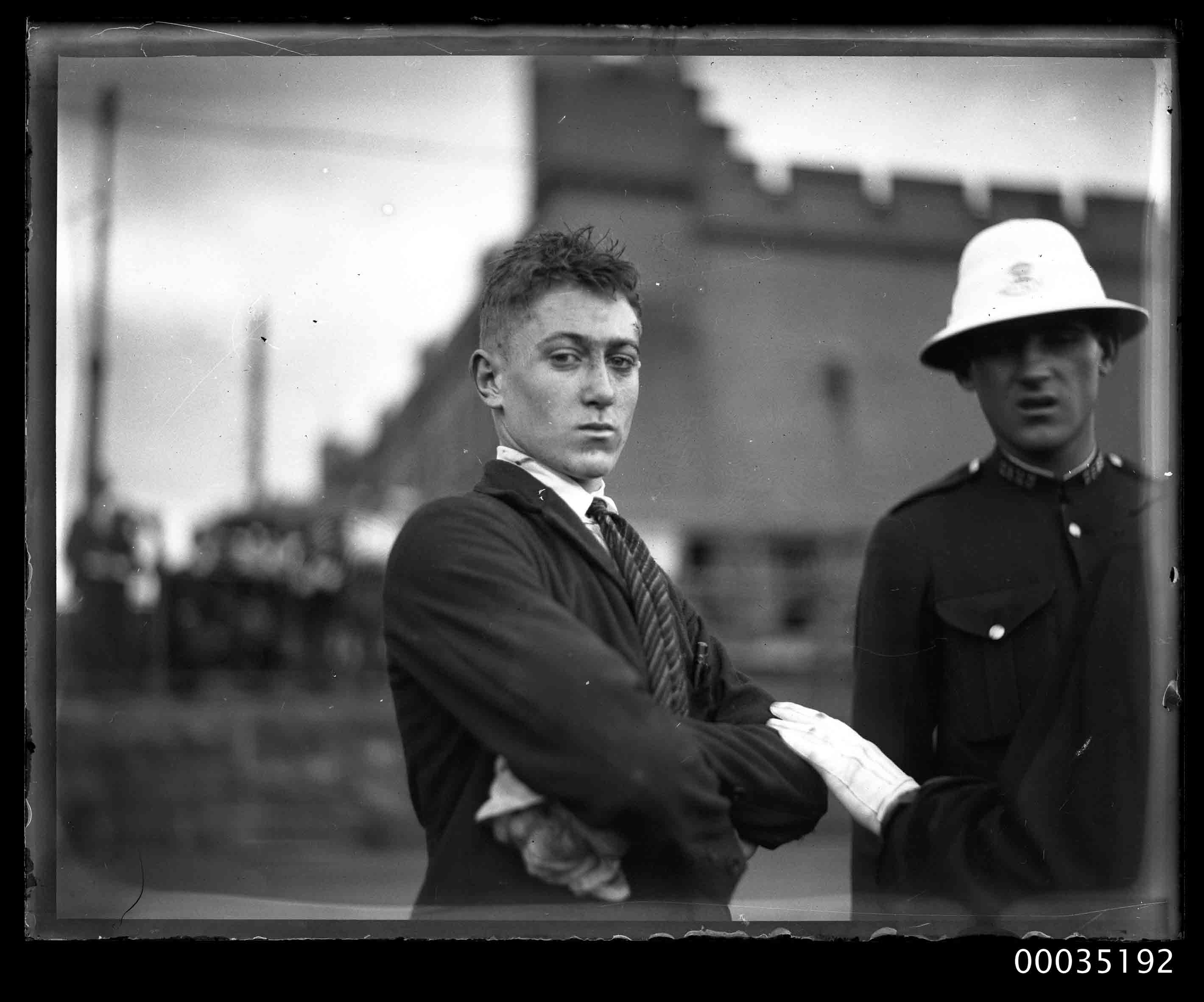
Injured passenger and policeman at Fort Macquarie

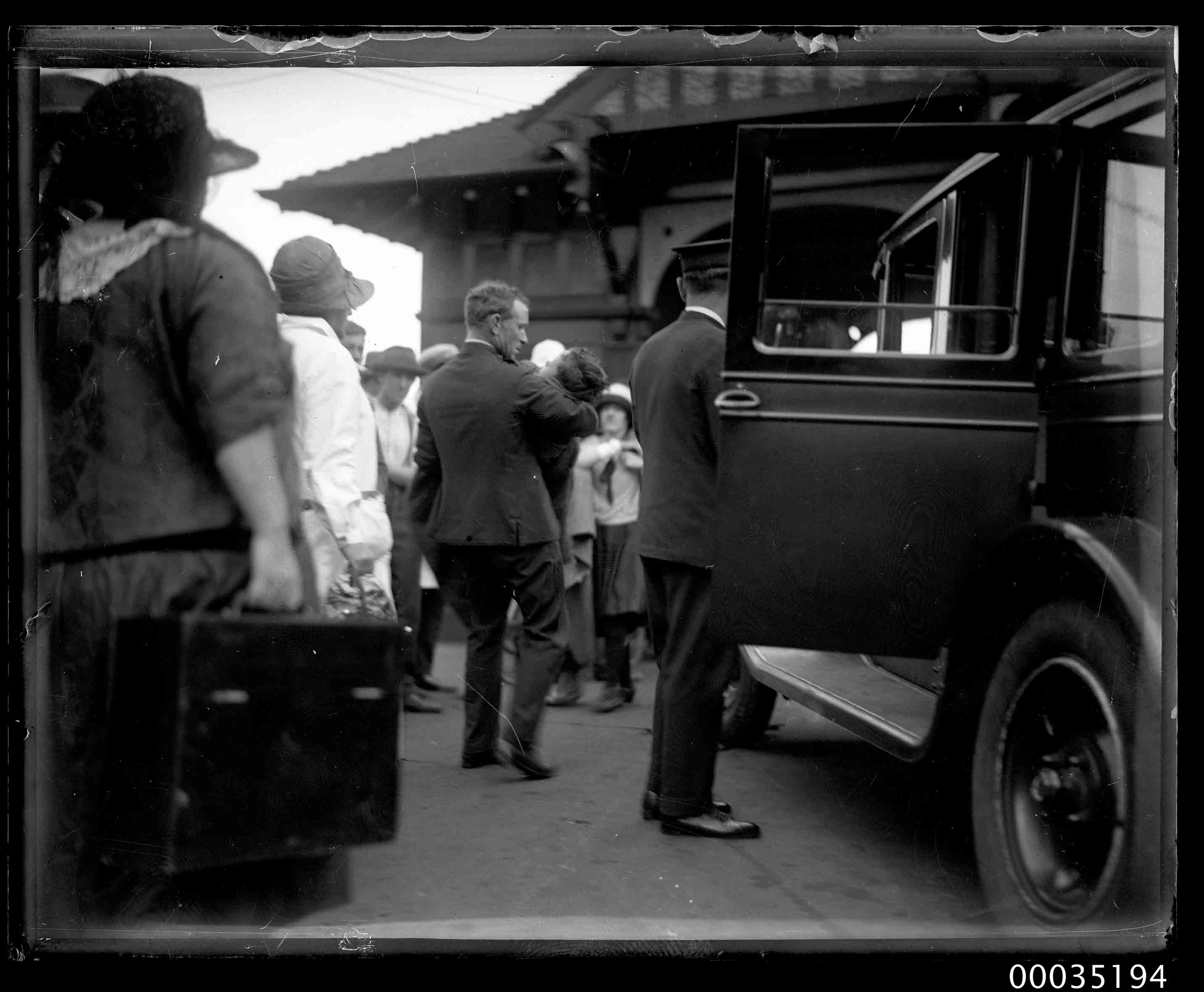
Man carrying injured boy at Fort Macquarie

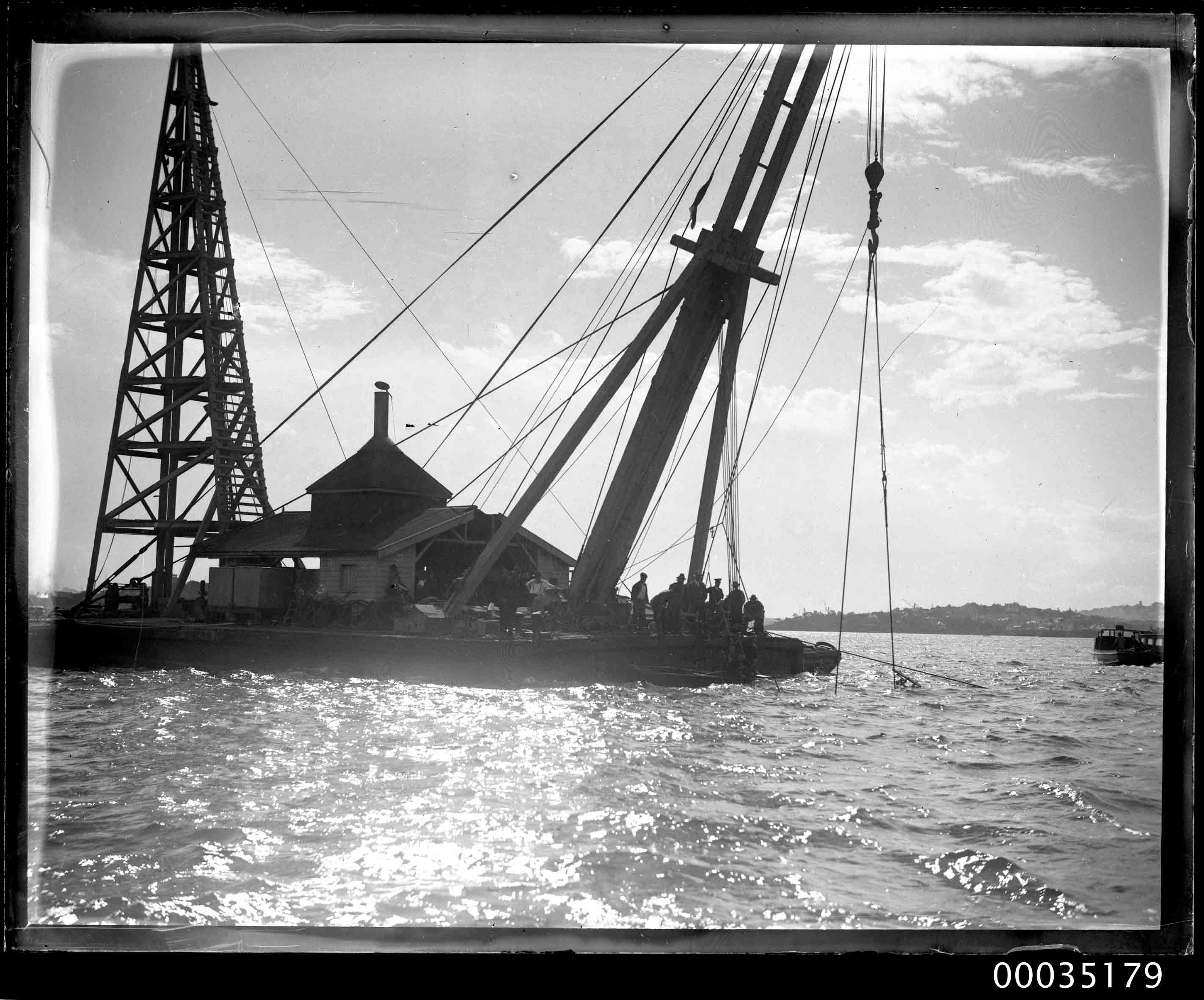
Sheerlegs crane salvaging the wreck

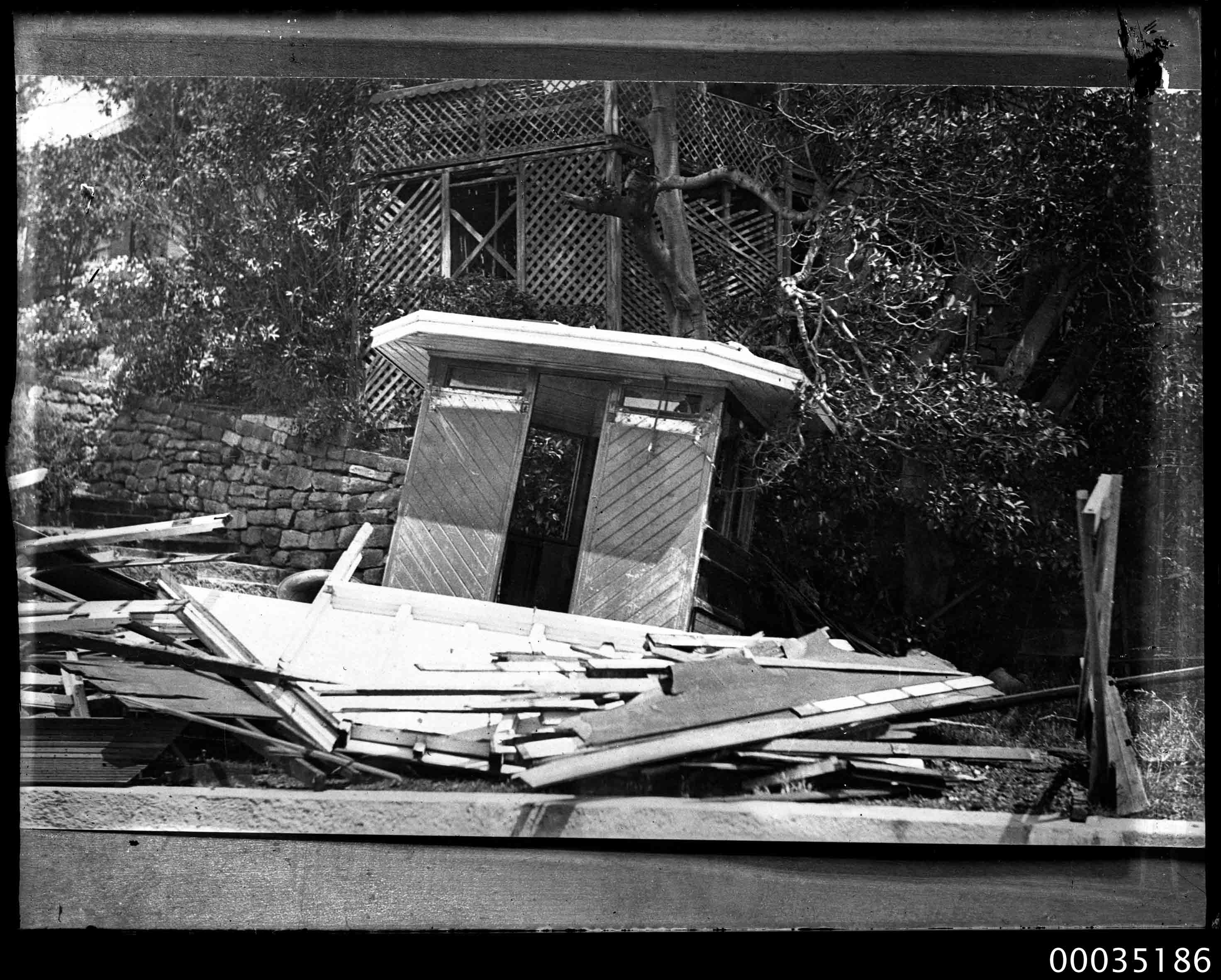
Greycliffe wheelhouse at Bradleys Head

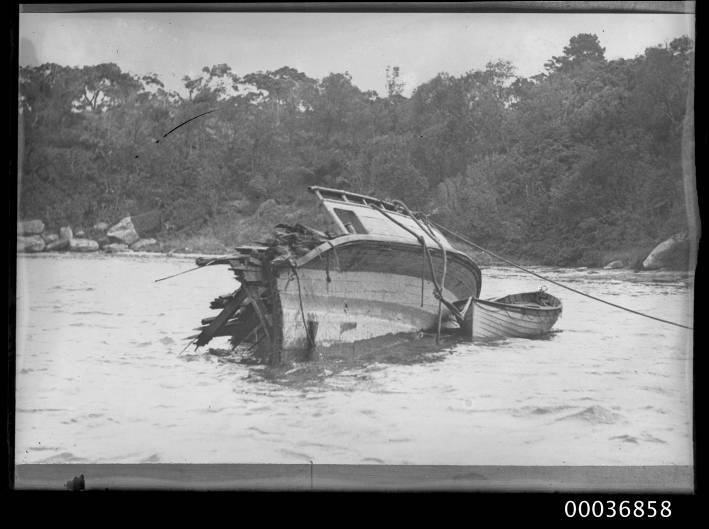
Hull section of the Greycliffe dragged to Whiting Beach.

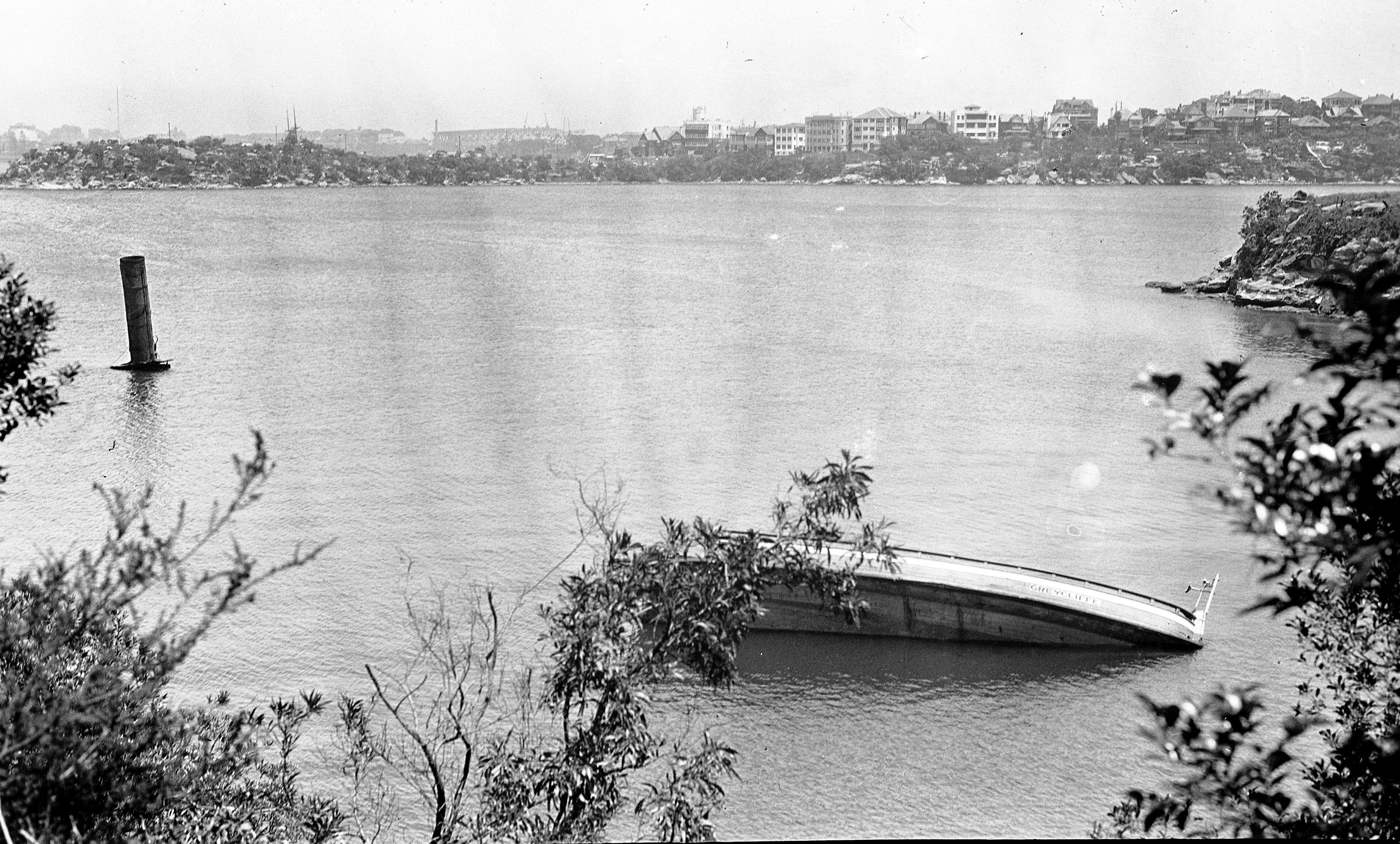
Funnel and hull section after being dragged to Whiting Beach

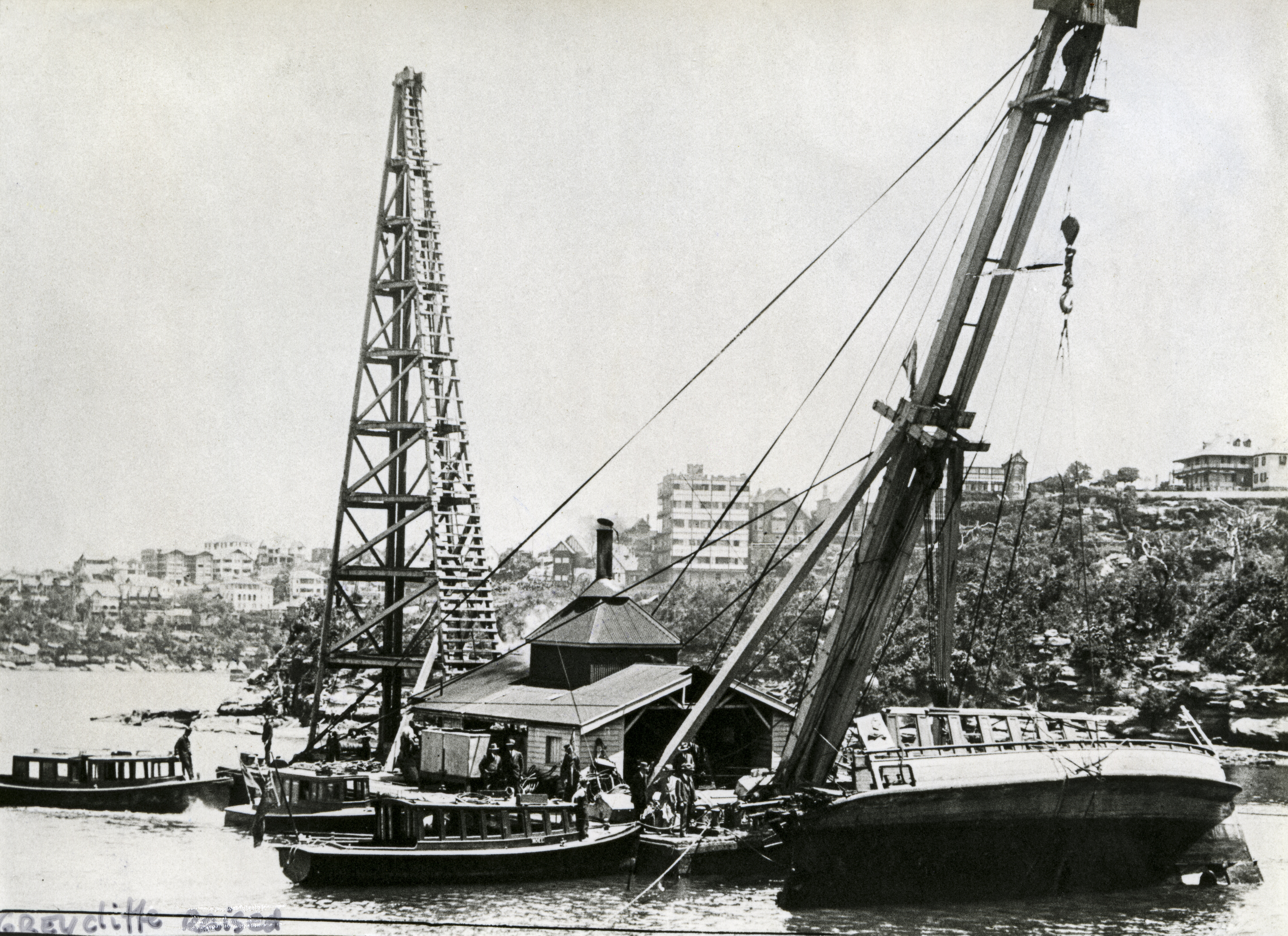
Hull remnants beached at Whiting Beach

== Investigations and aftermath ==
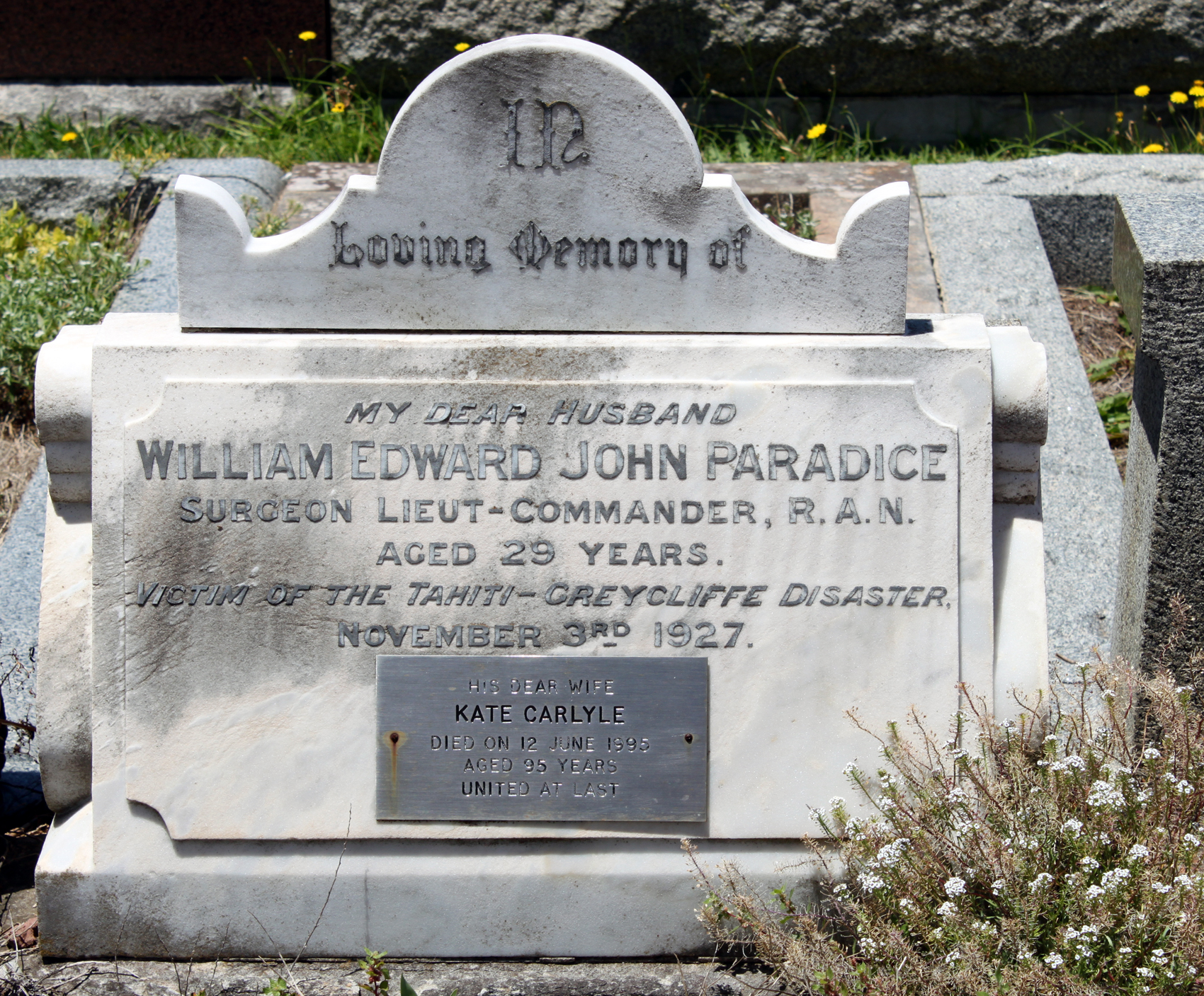
The grave of a Greycliffe disaster victim

The tragedy stunned people because of its swiftness and horror, as well as the 40 deaths and over 50 injured passengers. The weather and sea were calm, with good visibility.

Greycliffe′s design was identified as flawed with the wheelhouse offering no clear view of ships coming from behind. Most witnesses, including other ferry captains, agreed that Tahiti was going too fast and that Greycliffe, inexplicably, had turned sharp left into her path. Greycliffe′s captain, William Barnes, survived and claimed he had not consciously strayed from his course, and that he had not seen Tahiti until it was too late. He claimed that a few minutes from Garden Island, he felt the ferry pull to port, which he blamed on a problem with the steering mechanism for which he compensated.

The pilot on board Tahiti, Sydneysider Thomas Carson, said he saw the ferry swing left towards the ship, and he ordered the engines astern and changed course. Carson and his family, who unlike Barnes, lived in Watsons Bay, along with many of the victims' families, became persona non-grata in the eyes of some members of the community, according to Steve Brew. Blaming Carson, Sydney Ferries had the "bow theory", which stated that when a large and a small vessel were on parallel courses in shallow water, and with the larger vessel travelling faster, its bow wave could drag the smaller vessel into the larger one.

A Marine Court of Inquiry, formal Inquest, and Admiralty Court of Inquiry gradually shifted blame for the disaster from Tahiti′s pilot, Captain Thomas Carson, to the ferry master, William Barnes, and the probable failure of Greycliffe′s steering gear that allowed her to swing off course and into the path of the liner. The coronial inquest and the Admiralty Court dismissed the bow theory and accepted that, even though the Tahiti was going too fast, the collision wouldn't have occurred had not the Greycliffe turned into its path. A verdict was handed down by the final court of appeal in 1931, which concluded that while both captains were guilty of contributory negligence, the "Greycliffe′s navigator" was twice as culpable as Carson. The various inquiries had difficulty obtaining evidence between voyages of the Tahiti and, on one occasion, an embarrassing clash of the courts took place.

Using the transcripts of the inquiries, Brew believes Carson's reputation was unfairly tainted, in particular by Justice James Lang Campbell, the Supreme Court judge appointed to preside over the initial marine inquiry. Campbell accepted evidence from witnesses that Tahiti was probably travelling at 12 knots (22 km/h) instead of the permitted eight knots. However, he refuted evidence from the same witnesses that the Greycliffe had turned directly into the path of Tahiti.

== Sinking of Tahiti ==
On 15 August 1930, Tahiti′s hull was punctured by a broken propeller shaft while she was at sea between Wellington and Rarotonga. She wallowed for two-and-a-half days before sinking on 17 August 1930 without loss of life.

== Salvage of Greycliffe′s engines ==
The only part of Greycliffe to survive is the engine. In 1928, it was shipped to New Zealand. Where the engine was stored is not known but in 1938 the engine was installed into the Tīrau dairy factory in the Waikato region. A large, grooved 2-metre (6.5-foot) flywheel was fitted to the crankshaft. By using continuous rope belts, the engine drove ammonia compressors and butter churns. After 30 years service, it was donated to the Museum of Transport and Technology in Auckland and was installed as a working exhibit over the next four years.

== See also ==
- Rodney disaster
- List of Sydney Harbour ferries
- Timeline of Sydney Harbour ferries
- Bank effect - ship-to-bank interaction: comparable to Sydney Ferries' ship-to-ship "bow theory"

== Further reading and external links ==
- Brew, Steve. "The 1927 Tahiti-Greycliffe Disaster". The Thin Blue Line. NSW Police. Archived from the original on 2 August 2003.
- Waterway, a 1938 novel by Eleanor Dark is partly based on the Greycliffe Disaster
