= RMS Tahiti =

UK Royal Mail Ship

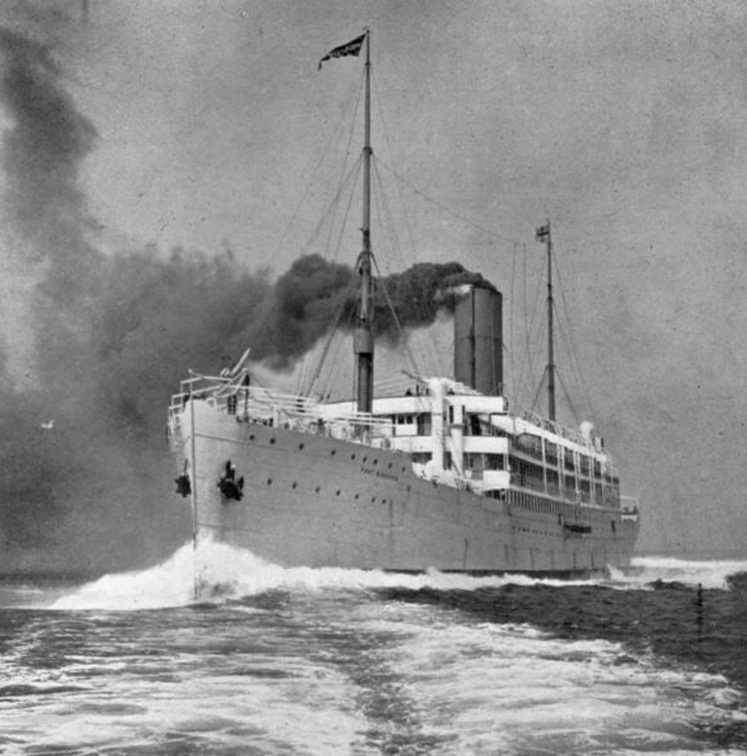
- Port Kingston in 1905

History

United Kingdom
- Name: 1904: Port Kingston; 1911: Tahiti
- Owner: 1904: Imperial Direct West Mail Co; 1911: Union Steam Ship Co of NZ
- Operator: 1904: Imperial Direct West Mail Co; 1911: Union Steam Ship Co of NZ
- Port of registry: 1904: Bristol; 1911: London
- Route: 1904: Bristol – Kingston, Jamaica 1911: Sydney – Wellington – San Francisco
- Builder: Alexander Stephen and Sons, Clydebank
- Yard number: 403
- Launched: 19 April 1904
- Acquired: 1911
- Identification: Official number 117715; Code letters VTWG
- Fate: Sank 17 August 1930

General characteristics
- Type: Ocean liner
- Tonnage: 7,585 GRT, 4,155 NRT
- Length: 460 ft (140 m)
- Beam: 55.5 ft (16.9 m)
- Draught: 27 ft (8.2 m)
- Depth: 24.4 ft (7.4 m)
- Installed power: 1,443 NHP
- Propulsion: 2 × triple expansion engines; 2 × screws
- Speed: 17 knots (31 km/h)
- Capacity: 515 passengers (as built); 36,370 cu ft (1,030 m^{3}) refrigerated cargo
- Crew: 135

RMS Tahiti was a UK Royal Mail Ship, ocean liner and refrigerated cargo ship. She was launched in 1904 in Scotland as RMS Port Kingston for a subsidiary of Elder Dempster Lines. In 1911 the Union Steamship Company of New Zealand bought her and renamed her Tahiti.

In the First World War she was a troop ship. In 1918 an outbreak of Spanish flu resulted in exceptionally high mortality amongst the troops aboard her. After the war she was returned to her owners.

In 1927 Tahiti collided with a ferry in Sydney Harbour, killing 40 ferry passengers. In 1930 Tahiti sank without loss of life in the South Pacific Ocean due to flooding caused by a broken propeller shaft.

== Characteristics and construction ==
Alexander Stephen and Sons of Govan on the River Clyde built the ship as Port Kingston for the Imperial Direct West Mail Company, which was a subsidiary of Elder Dempster Shipping Limited. She was launched on 19 April 1904 and completed that August.

She had berths for 277 first class, 97 second and 141 third class passengers on four decks and had a crew of 135. She had refrigerated holds with a capacity of 36,370 cu ft (1,030 m^{3}) to carry fruit.

== Early career ==
Port Kingston served the Bristol to Kingston, Jamaica route, which she was able to cover in ten-and-a-half days. Port Kingston was beached in the 1907 Kingston earthquake but was successfully refloated. She was laid up in 1910.

== To New Zealand ==
In 1911 the Union Steamship Company of New Zealand bought Port Kingston, had her refitted at Bristol and renamed her Tahiti. She was intended for the route Sydney to San Francisco via Wellington, Rarotonga and Tahiti. She began her first voyage on her new route on 11 December 1911.

== World War I ==
When the First World War began in 1914, Tahiti was requisitioned as the troop ship HMNZT ("His Majesty's New Zealand Transport") Tahiti. She was part of the convoy transporting the First Detachment of the Australian and New Zealand Imperial Expeditionary Forces, which left King George Sound, Albany, Western Australia on 1 November 1914. On 11 September 1915 she reached Wellington with the first casualties from the Gallipoli campaign.

== The 1918 influenza pandemic ==
Tahiti left New Zealand on 10 July 1918 with 1,117 troops and 100 crew aboard, bound for England. When she met the rest of her convoy at Freetown in Sierra Leone, reports of disease ashore led to a quarantine order for the ships. However, the ships were resupplied by local workers, and officers attended a conference aboard the armed merchant cruiser HMS Mantua, which had experienced an influenza outbreak three weeks earlier.

The first soldiers suffering from Spanish flu began reporting to the hospital aboard Tahiti on 26 August, the day that she left Freetown. By the time she arrived at Devonport on 10 September 68 men had died and a further nine died afterwards, an overall mortality rate of 68.9 persons per 1,000 population. It is estimated that more than 1,000 of those on board had been infected with the disease. A later enquiry found that mortality was worst in those over 40 years and that those over 25 had a higher mortality than those under 25. Mortality was also higher in those sleeping in bunk beds rather than in hammocks.

The conclusion of the enquiry was that overcrowding and poor ventilation had contributed to the exceptionally high infection rate and death toll. It was one of the worst outbreaks worldwide for the 1918/19 pandemic in terms of both morbidity and mortality.

== The Greycliffe disaster ==
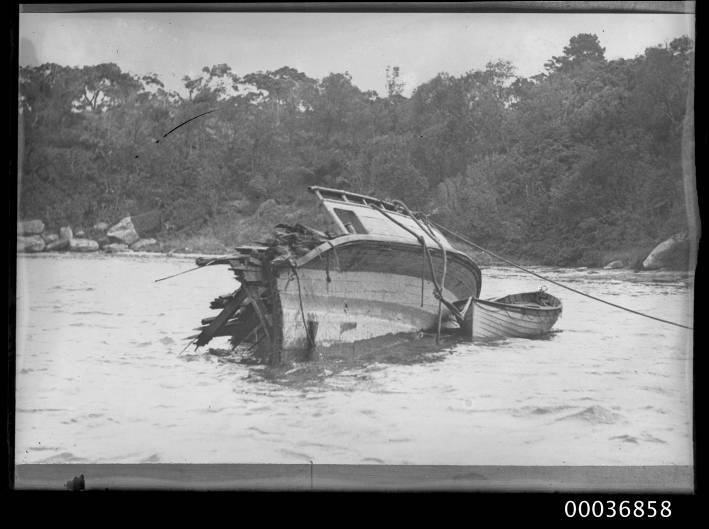
Hull section of Greycliffe dragged to Whiting Beach, Sydney Harbour.

In 1919 Tahiti was returned to her owners. In 1920 her furnaces were converted from coal firing to oil and she made one voyage to Vancouver, British Columbia. The next year she reverted to the San Francisco route.

On 3 November 1927, Tahiti collided with the Watsons Bay ferry Greycliffe off Bradleys Head in Sydney Harbour. The crowded ferry was split in two and sank within three minutes. Of 120 passengers on the ferry, 40 were killed.

== Sinking ==
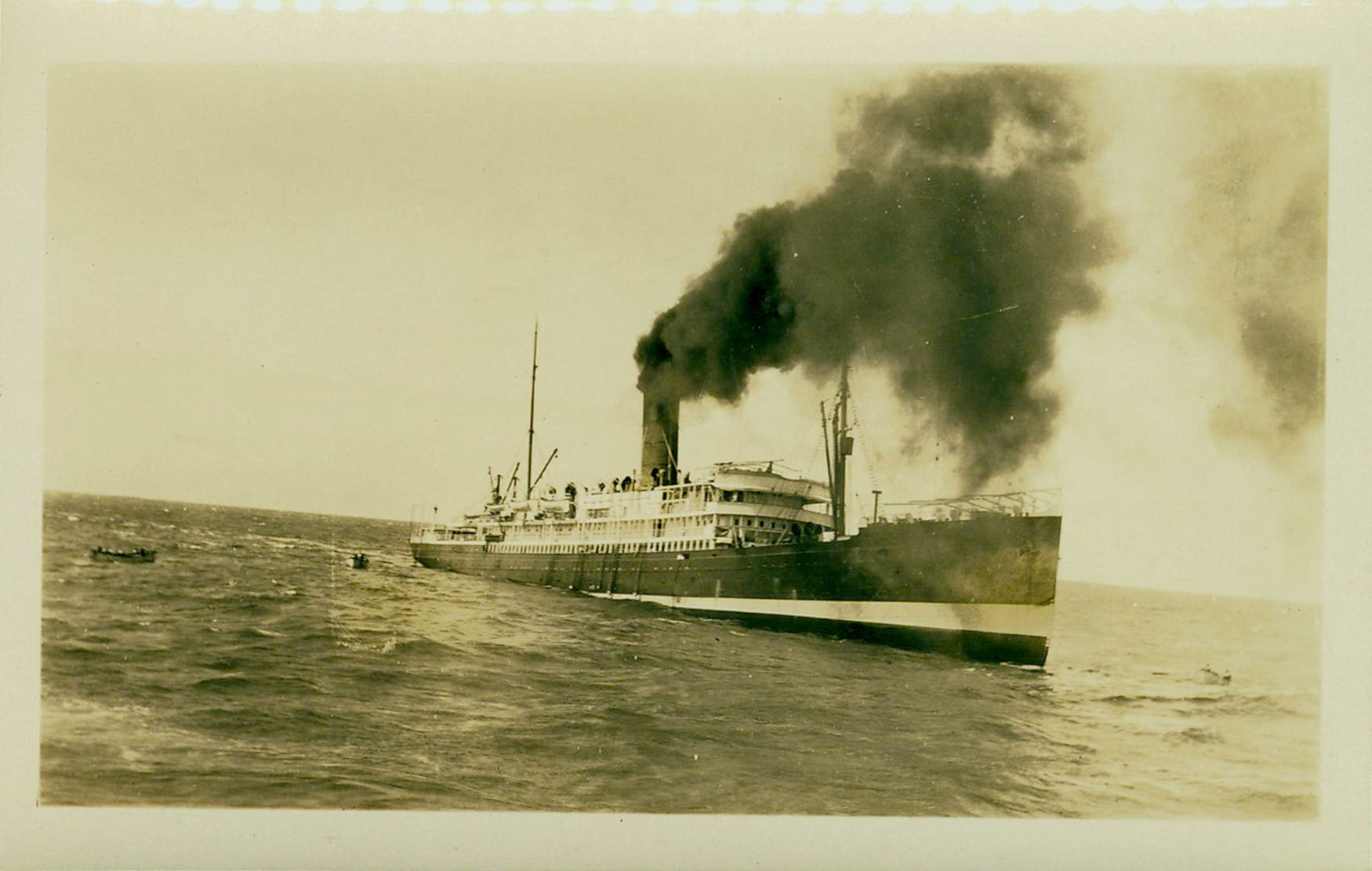
Lifeboats carry passengers from the sinking Tahiti, 17 August 1930

On 12 August 1930 Tahiti, carrying 103 passengers, 149 crew members, and 500 tons of general cargo, left Wellington to continue a voyage from Sydney to San Francisco. She was about 480 nautical miles (890 km; 550 mi) southwest of Rarotonga at 20°43′S 166°16′W at 4:30 a.m. on 15 August 1930 when her starboard propeller shaft broke, opening a large hole in her stern and causing rapid flooding. Her wireless operator transmitted a distress call, and her crew launched distress signal rockets, prepared the passengers for the possibility of abandoning ship, and fought the flooding in an effort to save the ship.

At 10:10 p.m. on 16 August, the Norwegian steamship Penybryn arrived to assist. Penybryn stood by Tahiti through the night of 16–17 August with her floodlights illuminating Tahiti and her boats ready to go to the assistance of Tahiti's passengers and crew if needed.

At 9:30 a.m. on 17 August, Tahiti's passengers and some of her crew abandoned ship, with all lifeboats away in 13 minutes. Some of her crew remained aboard in order to continue efforts to slow the flooding. The US steamship Ventura was just arriving on the scene, having signalled that she could take Tahiti's passengers and crew aboard, and she picked them up soon after they abandoned ship. Members of Tahiti's crew, aided by a boat from Penybryn, then returned to Tahiti in Tahiti's boats and began to try to save the first class mails and luggage from the sinking ship.

By 1:35 p.m. on 17 August, Tahiti was settling rapidly, and it became too dangerous for her crew to remain aboard. They abandoned ship, having saved the ship's papers and bullion. Tahiti sank, without loss of life, at 4:42 p.m. on 17 August 1930 at 24°44′S 166°15′W, about 460 nautical miles (850 km; 530 mi) from Rarotonga.

== Court of inquiry ==
A court of inquiry convened in Wellington, New Zealand, published its findings on the sinking in a report on 15 September 1930. The report was issued by the United Kingdom's Board of Trade in London on 11 December 1930. The court found that the sinking resulted from a breakage of the starboard propeller shaft that not only punctured Tahiti's hull at her stern, admitting water to her shaft tunnel – which the court deemed survivable – but also tore a hole in the bulkhead that divided the shaft tunnel from her engine room and number 3 hold. The court found that the latter hole ultimately caused the ship to sink, as the increasing weight of water flooding the shaft tunnel widened the hole in the bulkhead despite the crew's effort to contain the flooding and eventually overwhelmed their damage control efforts.

The court found both the crew and officials who had certified the ship's compliance with standards of seaworthiness blameless in the sinking, stated that the breaking of a propeller shaft was a common event at sea but the level of damage sustained by Tahiti in the breaking of her propeller shaft was exceedingly rare, and determined that Tahiti's sinking was "due to a peril of the sea which no reasonable human care or foresight could have avoided."

The court commended Tahiti's Master, TA Toten, for showing "resource and cool accurate judgment worthy of the highest praise," said that "all ranks under him responded to the example that he set," and noted the efforts of the ship's engineering staff, stating:

On the engineers and the engine room and stoke hold staff under them fell the brunt of the fight. For close on sixty hours, without sleep and without respite the engineers directed and waged a gallant losing fight against the relentless waters, working for long periods deep in water and in imminent danger of the collapse of the strained and partly rent bulkhead that imprisoned the wall of water high above them. It was their courage and endurance that made it possible for the master to delay until the propitious moment, the giving of the final order to abandon the ship.

The court concluded its report by stating "We deem it our duty to place on record this appreciation of the conduct of the master and all those under him."
