= Sydney Fast Ferries =

Australian ferry operator

- Defunct: 31 March 2015
- Headquarters: Rozelle, Sydney, Australia
- Area served: Port Jackson
- Services: Ferry operator
- Owner: Terry Dodd; John McPherson
- Website: www.sydneyfastferries.com.au

Sydney Fast Ferries operated high-speed ferry services on Port Jackson between Circular Quay and Manly from April 2010 until March 2015.

The business held a five-year government contract for wharf access and competed with Manly Fast Ferry, which continued operating after losing the tender. It ceased trading after Manly Fast Ferry won the subsequent contract, and two vessels used in its operations were sold to SeaLink Travel Group.

== History ==
=== Background ===
Since January 1965, the Port Jackson & Manly Steamship Company and its successors had operated high speed hydrofoil and later JetCat services between Circular Quay and Manly.

In December 2008, the New South Wales State Government called for expressions of interest in a commercial replacement for the Sydney Ferries JetCat service, without a government subsidy and with fares set by the operator. The JetCat service ended on 31 December 2008. Manly Fast Ferry commenced operating the service on 10 February 2009 on an interim basis until March 2010.

=== Establishment and competition ===
In December 2009, Seaflight Ferry Services, which would operate as Sydney Fast Ferries, won a five-year contract providing access to wharves at Manly and Circular Quay during the morning and afternoon peaks. Transport Minister David Campbell said it had made the most competitive bid among five local and international operators. The service remained deregulated, with the operator responsible for fares, ticketing and vessels. Services began on 1 April 2010, with a timetable of 36 peak-period trips and a scheduled crossing time of 18 minutes.

Manly Fast Ferry criticised the loss of its contract. Its director Richard Ford said a transport official had told him that Seaflight's financial offer for wharf access exceeded his company's bid. However, the contract did not prevent Manly Fast Ferry from continuing to compete. In January 2010, Bass & Flinders announced that it would retain its service using different pick-up and drop-off points.

Sydney Fast Ferries used the sheltered main terminal at Manly, while its competitor arranged to use the uncovered pier beside the Manly Wharf Hotel. In April 2010, The Sydney Morning Herald reported disputes between the operators over soliciting passengers and departure times. Sydney Fast Ferries charged $9 for a single trip, compared with Manly Fast Ferry's $8.50. Sydney Fast Ferries emphasised the shelter and convenience of its terminal, while Ford argued that his company had retained passengers' loyalty after replacing the JetCats.

=== Proposed expansion ===
In November 2011, the state government announced four additional routes to be operated by Sydney Fast Ferries and Manly Fast Ferry. The proposed services were to use existing wharves, operate without a government subsidy and avoid direct competition with existing Sydney Ferries routes. Sydney Fast Ferries was to operate three inner-harbour routes serving locations including Kirribilli, Rose Bay, Balmain, Woolwich and Pyrmont. By March 2012, it had been unable to organise the services, and the government announced that its wharf-access rights would be offered to other operators.

At the same time, Ford told the Herald that he had approached Sydney Fast Ferries about acquiring its contract and was willing to buy its vessels.

=== 2014 tender and closure ===
In 2014, the government sought tenders for a new fast-ferry contract. The bidders included Bass & Flinders Cruises, SeaLink Travel Group, Sydney Fast Ferries and Transit Systems. The proposed arrangement would replace the two competing fast-ferry services with a single operator.

In a December 2014 column, journalist Michael West raised concerns about potential conflicts of interest arising from Terry Dodd's interests in two bidders. Dodd was a part-owner and director of the company operating Sydney Fast Ferries and a director and shareholder of SeaLink. Transport for NSW said the interests had been disclosed in the tender responses, the assessment was overseen by two independent probity officers, and all applicants had signed non-collusion undertakings.

Manly Fast Ferry was announced as the successful bidder on 13 December 2014. The new contract provided for lower fares, increases limited to annual inflation, and more services than the two existing operators had offered together. Sydney Fast Ferries ceased trading on 31 March 2015. Manly Fast Ferry's seven-year contract began the following day.

== Business and vessels ==
Sydney Fast Ferries was based in Rozelle and was owned and operated by managing director John McPherson and chairman Terry Dodd. A February 2015 SeaLink disclosure identified the operator as Global Traders Marine Pty Ltd, trading under the Sydney Fast Ferries business name.

The business operated the catamarans Maggie Cat and Palm Cat. Palm Cat, built by Aluminium Boats Australia in 2008, was transferred from Sunferries' Townsville operations to the Manly service. Sydney Fast Ferries expanded its timetable to include weekends and public holidays in 2014. It also offered whale-watching trips, harbour cruises and private charters through Sydney Adventure Cruises.

On 1 April 2015, SeaLink purchased Maggie Cat and Palm Cat from Sunrop Pty Ltd for $6 million plus GST. Palm Cat was transferred to Townsville, while the other vessel remained in Sydney for harbour services and whale-watching cruises.
