= Manly Fast Ferry =

Ferry service in Sydney

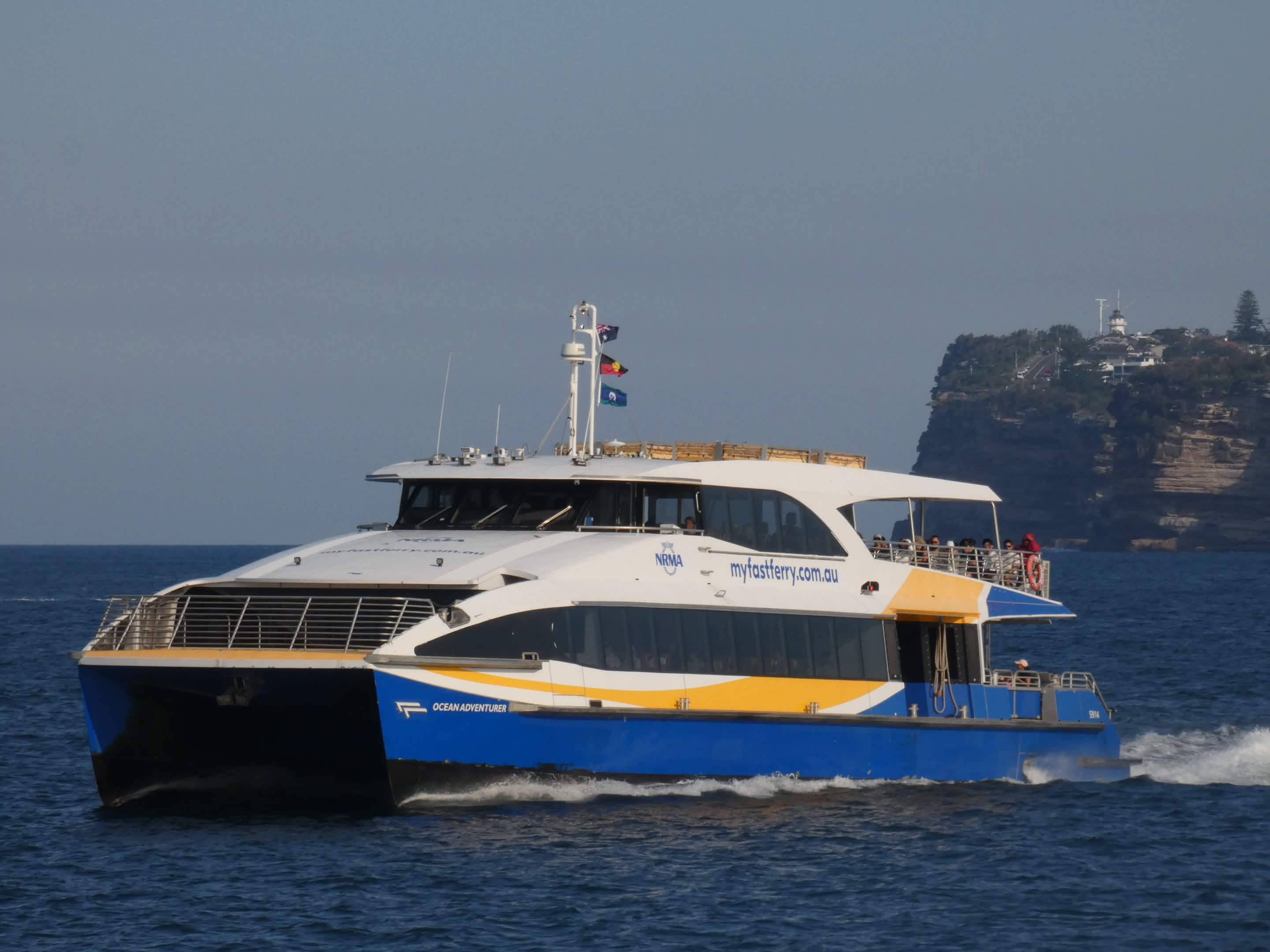
- Ocean Adventurer in April 2026
- Founded: 2009
- Founder: Richard Ford; Will Ford
- Headquarters: Sydney, Australia
- Area served: Port Jackson
- Services: Ferry operator
- Parent: NRMA
- Website: My Fast Ferry

Manly Fast Ferry is an Australian ferry operator providing a high-speed passenger service between Circular Quay and Manly on Sydney Harbour. Established in 2009 by Bass & Flinders Cruises, it is owned by the NRMA and also uses the business name My Fast Ferry.

The service began as a commercial replacement for the government-operated JetCats. Manly Fast Ferry competed with Sydney Fast Ferries between 2010 and 2015. A contract awarded in 2014 made it the sole operator of the fast-ferry service between Circular Quay and Manly from April 2015. The service became part of the integrated Opal fare system in 2023.

== History ==
=== Establishment ===
Since January 1965, the Port Jackson & Manly Steamship Company and its successors had operated high speed hydrofoil and later JetCat services between Circular Quay and Manly.

The Sydney Ferries JetCat service ended on 31 December 2008. The state government sought a private replacement operating without a government subsidy, with the operator responsible for fares, patronage and operating risks. In January 2009, Bass & Flinders Cruises was selected to provide the service.

Bass & Flinders Cruises trading as Manly Fast Ferry commenced operating the service on 10 February 2009 on an interim basis until March 2010.

The first service was met by a Maritime Union of Australia protest over wages, working conditions and safety. The company said its vessels had been declared safe by NSW Maritime. Later that month, the company agreed to negotiate a three-year agreement providing a 25 per cent wage increase and addressing safety concerns, settling the dispute.

=== Competition with Sydney Fast Ferries ===
In December 2009, the government awarded a five-year wharf-access contract to Sydney Fast Ferries, which began operating on 1 April 2010. The contract did not grant exclusive rights to the route. Manly Fast Ferry arranged alternative wharf access and continued operating in competition with the successful tenderer. Transport Minister David Campbell said other operators could provide a service if they secured wharf access and completed the journey within 20 minutes.

Sydney Fast Ferries used the sheltered main terminal at Manly, while Manly Fast Ferry operated from an uncovered pier beside it. In April 2010, The Sydney Morning Herald reported disputes over passenger solicitation and departure times. Manly Fast Ferry charged $8.50 for a single trip, compared with its rival's $9, while Sydney Fast Ferries emphasised the shelter and convenience of its wharf facilities. In March 2012, Manly Fast Ferry managing director Richard Ford told the newspaper that he had approached Sydney Fast Ferries about acquiring its contract and was willing to buy its vessels.

=== 2014 tender and sole-operator contract ===
In 2014, the government sought tenders for a new contract under which the two competing fast-ferry services would be replaced by a single operator. Bidders included Bass & Flinders Cruises, SeaLink Travel Group, Sydney Fast Ferries and Transit Systems.

In a December 2014 column, The Sydney Morning Herald journalist Michael West raised concerns about potential conflicts of interest arising from Terry Dodd's interests in both Sydney Fast Ferries' parent company and rival bidder SeaLink. Transport for NSW said the interests had been disclosed in the tender responses, two independent probity officers were overseeing the process, and all bidders had signed non-collusion undertakings.

Bass & Flinders won the contract in December 2014. Sydney Fast Ferries ceased trading on 31 March 2015, and Manly Fast Ferry began the new seven-year contract on 1 April. The agreement provided for lower fares, with subsequent increases limited to annual inflation, and an expanded timetable.

=== NRMA ownership ===
The business name My Fast Ferry was registered in September 2017. In December 2017, the NRMA announced its acquisition of the business from founders Richard and Will Ford for an undisclosed sum. The founders retained an economic interest and continued as chief executive and chief operating officer respectively. The acquisition was completed in early 2018.

In October 2018, the NRMA also acquired Fantasea Cruising, adding 10 ferries and 10 water taxis to its fleet.

=== 2022 contract and emissions plans ===
In December 2022, the government announced a further 15-year agreement with the NRMA, including increased peak-hour services and integration into the Opal fare system. The agreement included plans to convert ferries to hydrogen–diesel hybrid propulsion, subject to regulatory approval, and explore electric operation. An 85 per cent reduction in carbon emissions by 2038 was an announced target.

In a presentation reported by the Asian Development Bank in March 2026, the operator's sustainability representative said hydrogen retrofits were not yet feasible. The company was instead pursuing measures including hull cleaning, reduced vessel weight, changes to operating practices and propeller upgrades to reduce fuel consumption.

== Services and ticketing ==
The principal service connects Circular Quay and Manly in approximately 20 minutes. The company has also operated sightseeing and whale-watching cruises and services to other harbour destinations. A peak-hour route between Manly, Milsons Point and Darling Harbour began in January 2012. The Manly–Darling Harbour commuter service was suspended during the COVID-19 pandemic; in January 2023, the operator said demand had not recovered sufficiently for it to resume.

In August 2019, Manly Fast Ferry reduced weekly one-way services on the Circular Quay–Manly route from 719 to 542 while retaining peak-hour frequency. The company attributed the reduction to weaker winter off-peak demand and said it was unrelated to the industrial dispute then affecting its operations. Transport for NSW said the revised timetable provided sufficient capacity to meet demand.

In December 2017, Manly Fast Ferry became the first private operator to accept OpalPay, allowing passengers to pay from their Opal card balance using the operator's payment equipment. These payments did not initially qualify for the integrated network's travel benefits. Full Opal integration began on 1 October 2023, bringing the Circular Quay–Manly service into the network's fare caps and transfer discounts, with the same single-journey fares as the F1 Manly ferry service.

== Fleet ==
In 2015, the company ordered four Incat catamarans from the Tasmanian shipbuilder: two 24-metre vessels and two 33-metre vessels. The smaller vessels, Ocean Tracker and Ocean Wave, entered service on 23 December 2015. The larger Ocean Flyer and Ocean Surfer were delivered in March 2016. A third 33-metre vessel, Ocean Adventurer, was launched in July 2018.

== Industrial relations ==
In December 2018, the Fair Work Commission quashed approval of an enterprise agreement covering employees of Noorton Pty Ltd, which operated Manly Fast Ferry. The commission found that the agreement failed the better off overall test against award conditions. The NRMA said negotiations were continuing and that it was acting in good faith.

Negotiations over pay and casual employment led to repeated strikes in 2019. The company offered wage increases and conversion of casual positions to permanent employment; the Maritime Union of Australia argued that the proposed conditions remained below those of workers on the government-owned ferry fleet.

In September 2019, the Federal Court dismissed the NRMA's claims against the union for trade-mark infringement, misleading or deceptive conduct and injurious falsehood arising from its industrial campaign. The court treated the union's description of employees as "second-class citizens" as an opinion. Although it found the union's claims that the ferries were unsafe and all staff were casual to be misleading, the consumer-law claim failed because the statements were not made in trade or commerce. A new enterprise agreement covering masters, coxswains, deckhands and hosts came into operation in November 2019.

== Safety investigations ==
On 28 May 2016, Ocean Rider collided with Circular Quay Wharf 6 while berthing; four injured passengers were taken to hospital. The Office of Transport Safety Investigations found that the starboard engine had stalled when reverse was engaged and identified deficiencies in the operator's risk controls. On 13 September 2017, Ocean Wave collided with Manly Wharf, injuring passengers. Investigators attributed the collision to an unsuccessful transfer of engine control between stations and identified deficiencies in warning systems and operating procedures.
