= SS South Steyne =

Former Manly ferry service in Sydney

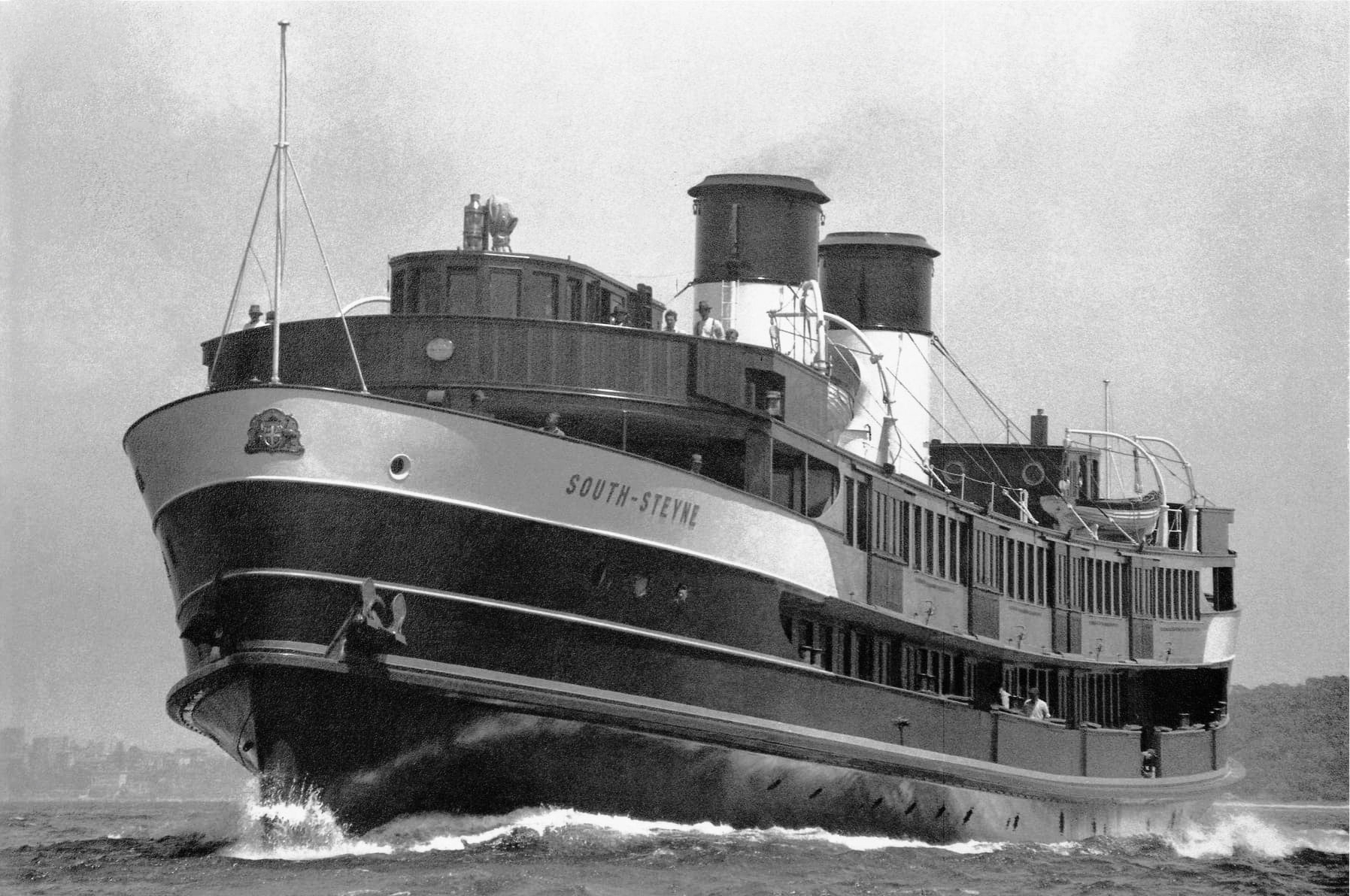
- South Steyne on her sea trials, 1938

History

Australia
- Name: South Steyne
- Owner: Port Jackson & Manly Steamship Company
- Route: Manly
- Builder: Henry Robb, Leith
- Cost: £141,526
- Yard number: 267
- Launched: 1 April 1938
- In service: 24 October 1938
- Out of service: August 1974
- Identification: IMO number: 5335151; MMSI Number: Callsign: VMDD

General characteristics
- Type: double-ended, double-screw steamship ferry
- Tonnage: 1,203 GT
- Length: 67.23 m (220 ft 7 in)
- Beam: 11.76 m (38 ft 7 in)
- Installed power: 2,420 kW (3,250 hp) 4-cylinder, triple expansion steam engine

SS South Steyne is a former Manly ferry on Sydney Harbour. She was the world's largest steam-powered passenger ferry and operated on the service from 1938 to 1974. Restored in the 1980s, she served as a restaurant ship in Newcastle in the 1990s, and in 2000 was moved back to Sydney and open to the public at Darling Harbour. Since April 2016 she has been stored at Berrys Bay. She was added to the New South Wales State Heritage Register on 2 April 1999.

The South Steyne was designed by Walter Leslie Dendy and John Ashcroft and built from 1937 to 1938 by Henry Robb of Scotland.

== Description ==
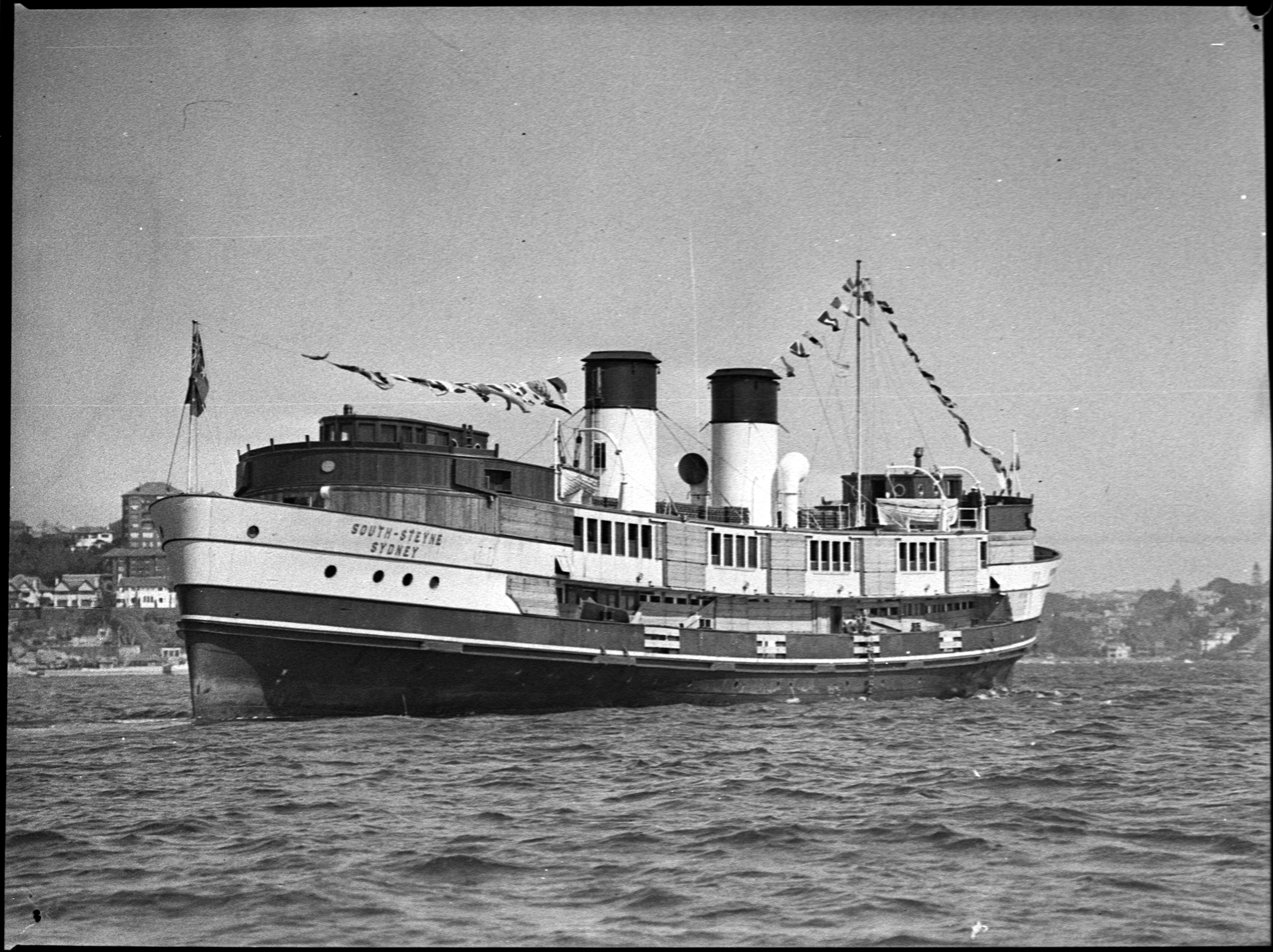
Ferry South Steyne, Sydney, 9 September 1938

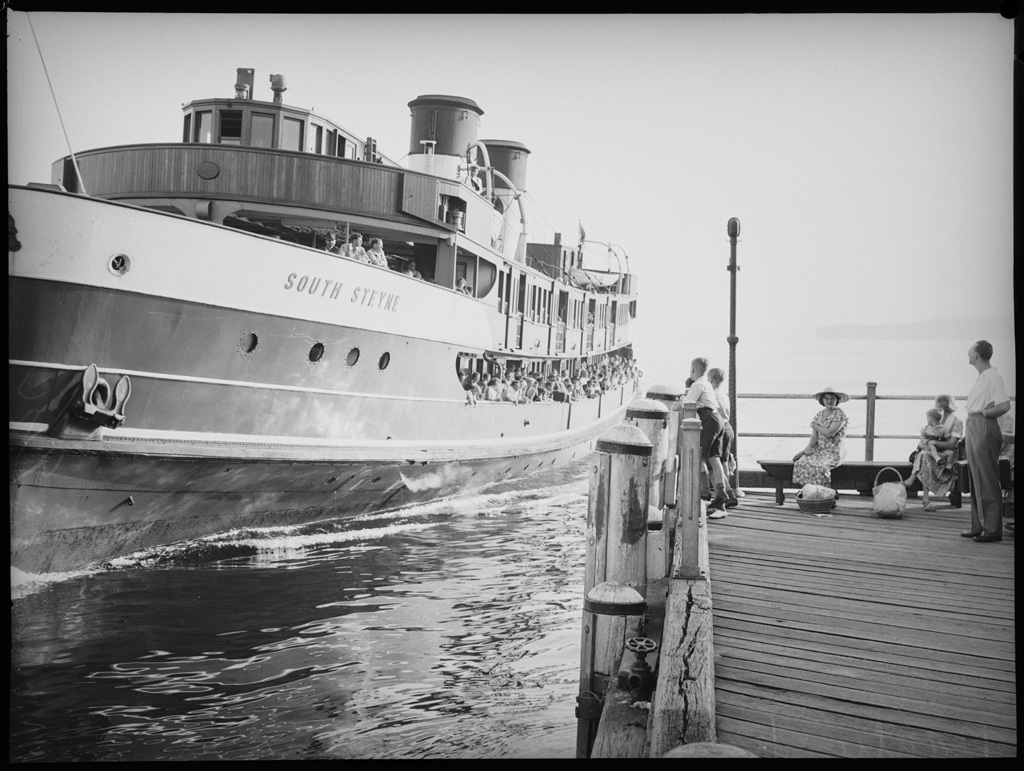
At Manly Wharf, 1952

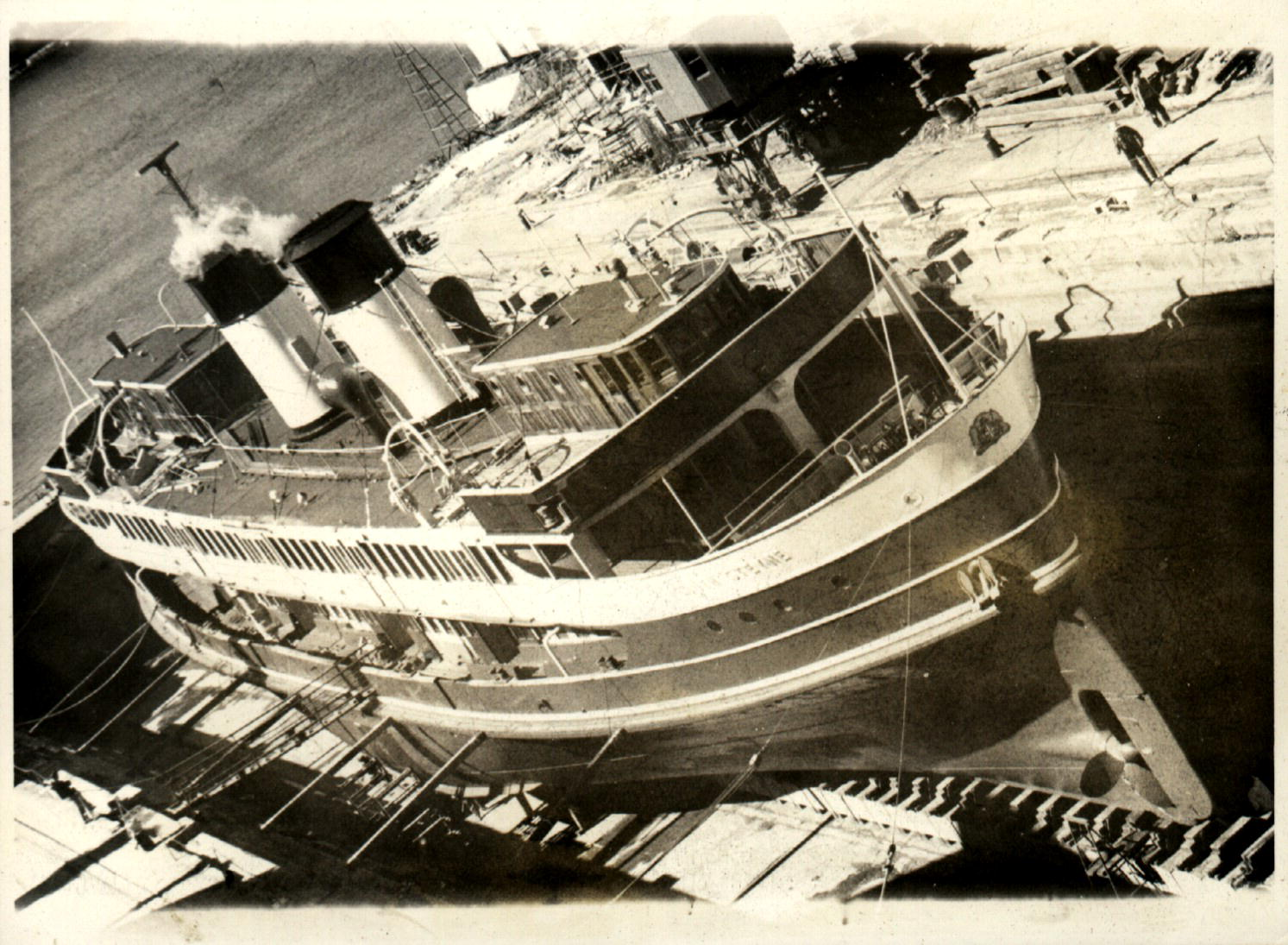
Fitzroy Dock, Cockatoo Island, 1970

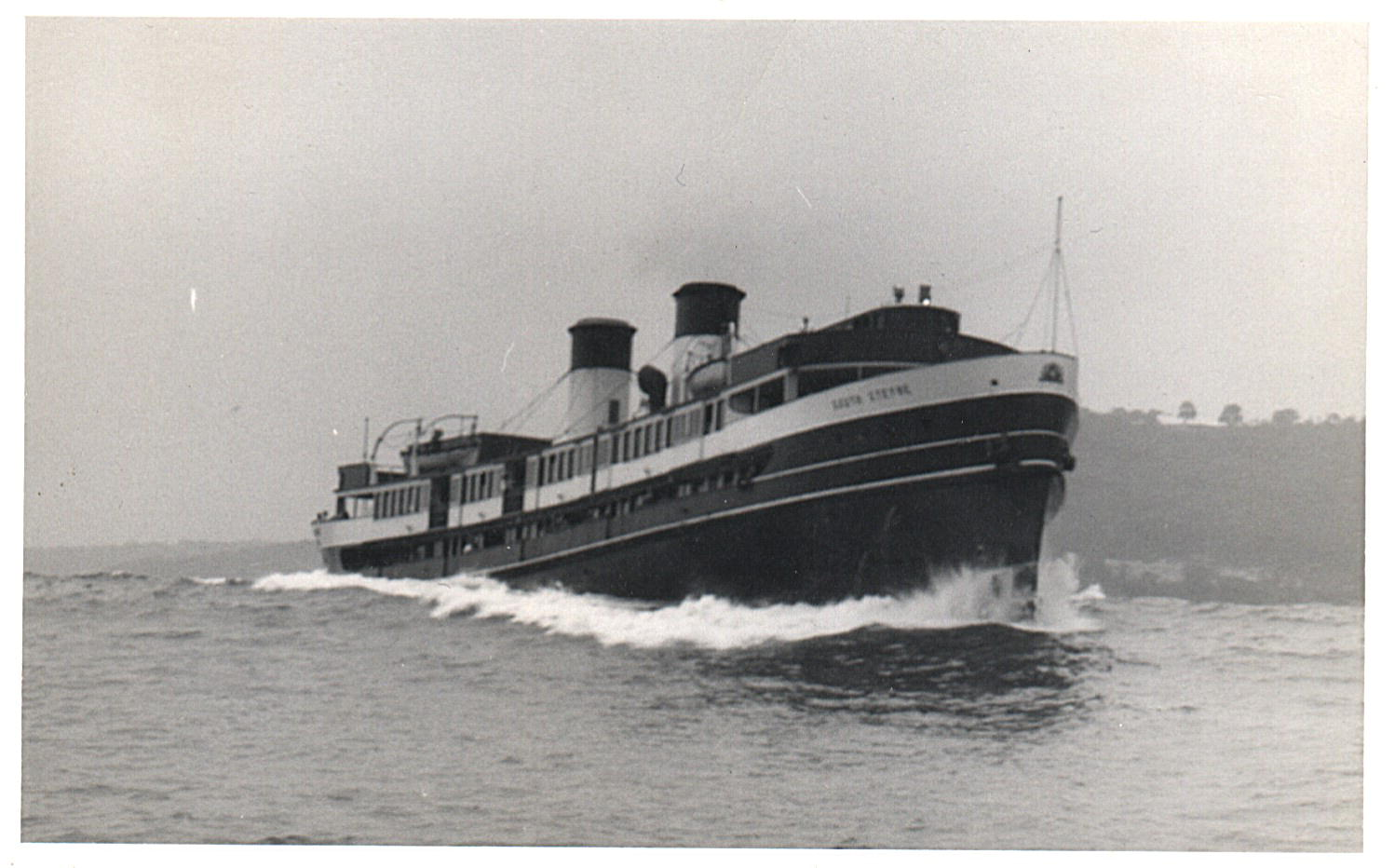
Crossing the Heads in swell

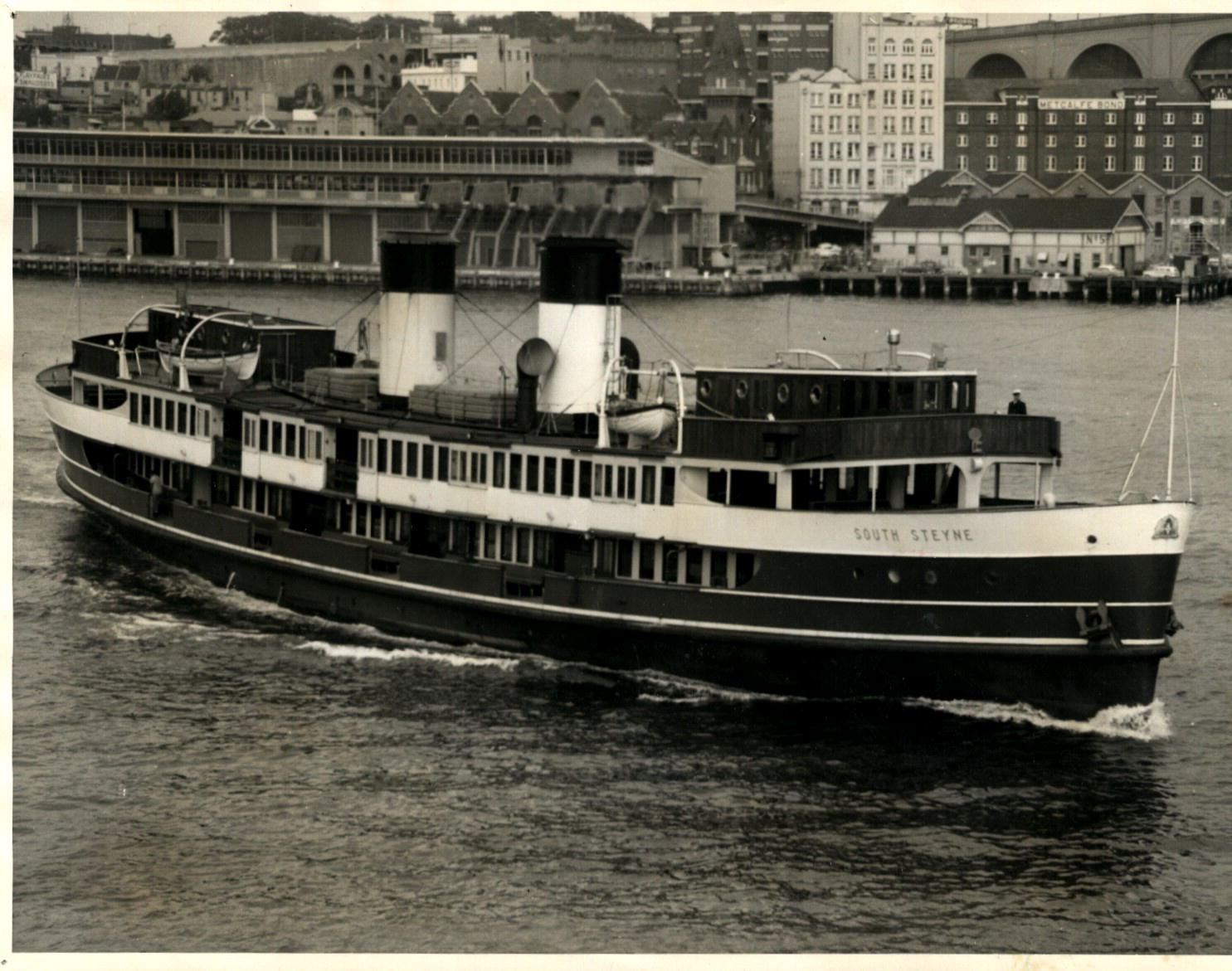
Leaving Circular Quay for Manly, 1970

South Steyne is a double-ended, double-screw steamship powered by a 2,420-kilowatt (3,250 hp), four-cylinder triple expansion steam engine. The ship's boilers were fitted to burn either coal or oil however, she has only used oil. She could achieve a speed in excess of 17 knots (31 km/h; 20 mph), almost as fast as the twin Manly ferries, Dee Why and Curl Curl, in service since 1928.

With a length of 67.23 metres (220 ft 7 in), beam of 11.76 metres (38 ft 7 in), and measured at 1,203 gross tonnage (GT), she was the largest ferry to operate in Sydney Harbour and was designed and built to ocean-going ship standards. As a passenger ferry, she had a capacity of 1,781 passengers.

She has a riveted steel hull, steel superstructure to sun deck level, steel bulwarks, teak decks and wheelhouses, eight watertight bulkheads, bar keel, double bottom under engine only. The steel superstructure rises to sun deck level, with teak decks and wheelhouses. She has two funnels including a dummy containing a water tank.

== Construction and delivery ==
The Port Jackson and Manly Steamship Co. Ltd. was the best known of the Sydney ferry operators and was renowned for the large and comfortable steamers that it ran to the seaside suburb and resort of Manly. Patronage was growing steadily in the 1930s and to increase fleet capacity and vessel speed the Port Jackson Co. ordered a new ferry boat. In December 1936 the General Manager of the Port Jackson Co., Walter Leslie Dendy went to Britain to study sea transportation, propulsion techniques and to order a new ferry. By March 1937, seven shipbuilders had submitted tenders.

The contract was awarded to the Scottish shipbuilder Henry Robb Ltd in Leith, Scotland for a steam reciprocating ship. The engine was built by Harland & Wolff, Belfast. The keel of the vessel was laid at Robb's Leith Yard in October 1937, and South Steyne was launched on 1 April 1938. The name of the vessel came from the promenade behind the ocean beach at Manly.

She set off on 7 July with seventeen crew on board and with her vulnerable areas boarded up. Bringing her to Australia was Pedder and Mylchreest Ltd. of London and Captain R. M. Beadie was the master for the 22,000-kilometre (14,000 mi) voyage. Beedie returned to England after the voyage. Also on the voyage was Captain A. E. Rowlings, who acted as first officer who went to England to take delivery of the vessel on behalf of the owner, and Captain C. Henderson, the second officer, who was reported by The Sydney Morning Herald to be a native of Manly.

Passing through the Mediterranean in the lead up to World War II, she was checked first by French then Italian warships, and later a submarine. In the Suez Canal, the Canal Authority held her up as she did not have the correct masts and cable handling gear. She was eventually let through but without priority having to let other vessels pass. Waiting for a passing tanker, she was washed aground into the mud. Under tow by a French tug in an attempt to dislodge her, a line was caught up in her bow propeller which had to be removed by divers. She was further delayed by sandstorms and heavy seas in the Red Sea; however, she performed well in the south-west monsoon. South Steyne first sighted Australia in August, and after 64 days from Leith, she arrived in Sydney at midday on 9 September.

== Ferry service ==
The South Steyne was the largest ferry to operate on Sydney Harbour. Between 1938 and 1974, she ran on the Manly service, crossing between Circular Quay and Manly over 100,000 times, carrying in excess of 92 million passengers.

Along with the other Manly ferries, during the Second World War, the South Steyne's white sections were painted a dark green to prevent it being seen at night.

In 1953, she was certified to cruise at sea within a 26-nautical-mile (48 km; 30 mi) radius of Sydney Harbour. An AWA HF Teleradio and a Grinnell fire sprinkler system were installed. She was used to run Sunday ocean cruises out of Sydney Harbour and north to Broken Bay. It was the first time a Manly ferry had steamed up to Broken Bay since Binngarra and Burra Bra had been flagships for the annual regatta in the 1920s. South Steyne also was used to follow the start of the Boxing Day Sydney to Hobart yacht races out to sea. In 1964, a cocktail bar was installed and she was allowed to sell liquor while at sea. In 1967, an AWA KH Type 17 radar set was fitted.

In 1964, the South Steyne collided with the freighter Jason, and the ferry received bow damage. On 29 September 1970, South Steyne collided with the moored aircraft carrier HMAS Melbourne while avoiding a cluster of sailing craft. Nobody was hurt and South Steyne again received minor damage to the bow.

== Fire and retirement ==
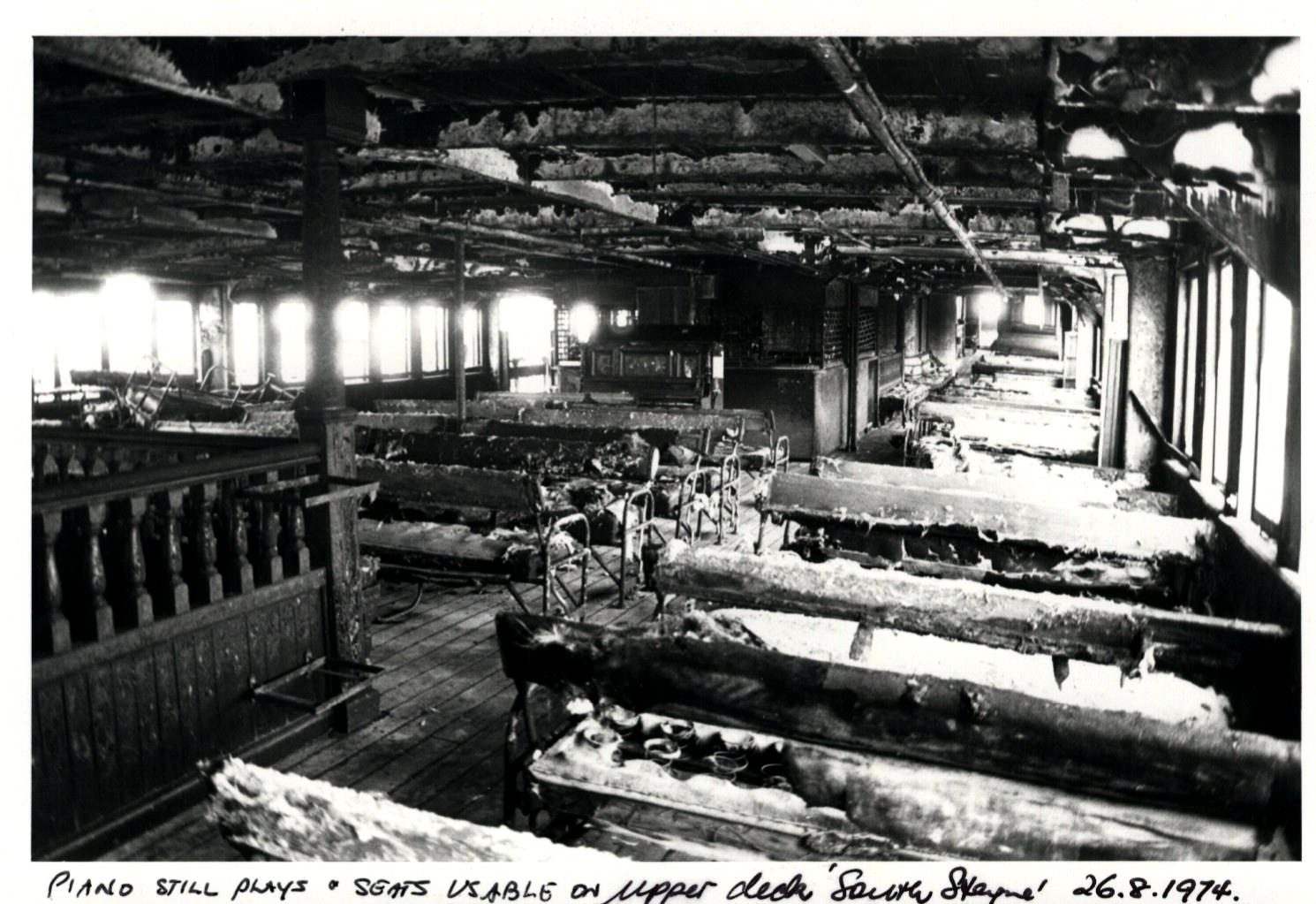
August 1974, upper deck interior after the fire

By 1970, the Manly ferry service was struggling due to lower patronage and maintenance of older ferries, including South Steyne, was being reduced. Brambles Holdings took over the Manly service from Port Jackson and Manly Steamship Company in 1971. Several ferries were retired and reduced maintenance saw South Steyne's sea-going certificate cancelled in 1973 ending the ocean cruises. At this time, South Steyne was the last steam ferry operating in Sydney. Her engines used three times the fuel of the other two remaining Manly ferries - the significantly smaller diesel-electric powered Baragoola and North Head.

On 25 August 1974, while she was moored at Balmain Wharf waiting to be surveyed under a government option to buy, a fire damaged the fan room, middle stairway, seats and paintwork on the upper promenade deckhouse above. The Public Transport Commission took over Baragoola and North Head but not South Steyne.

== Restoration and contemporary use ==
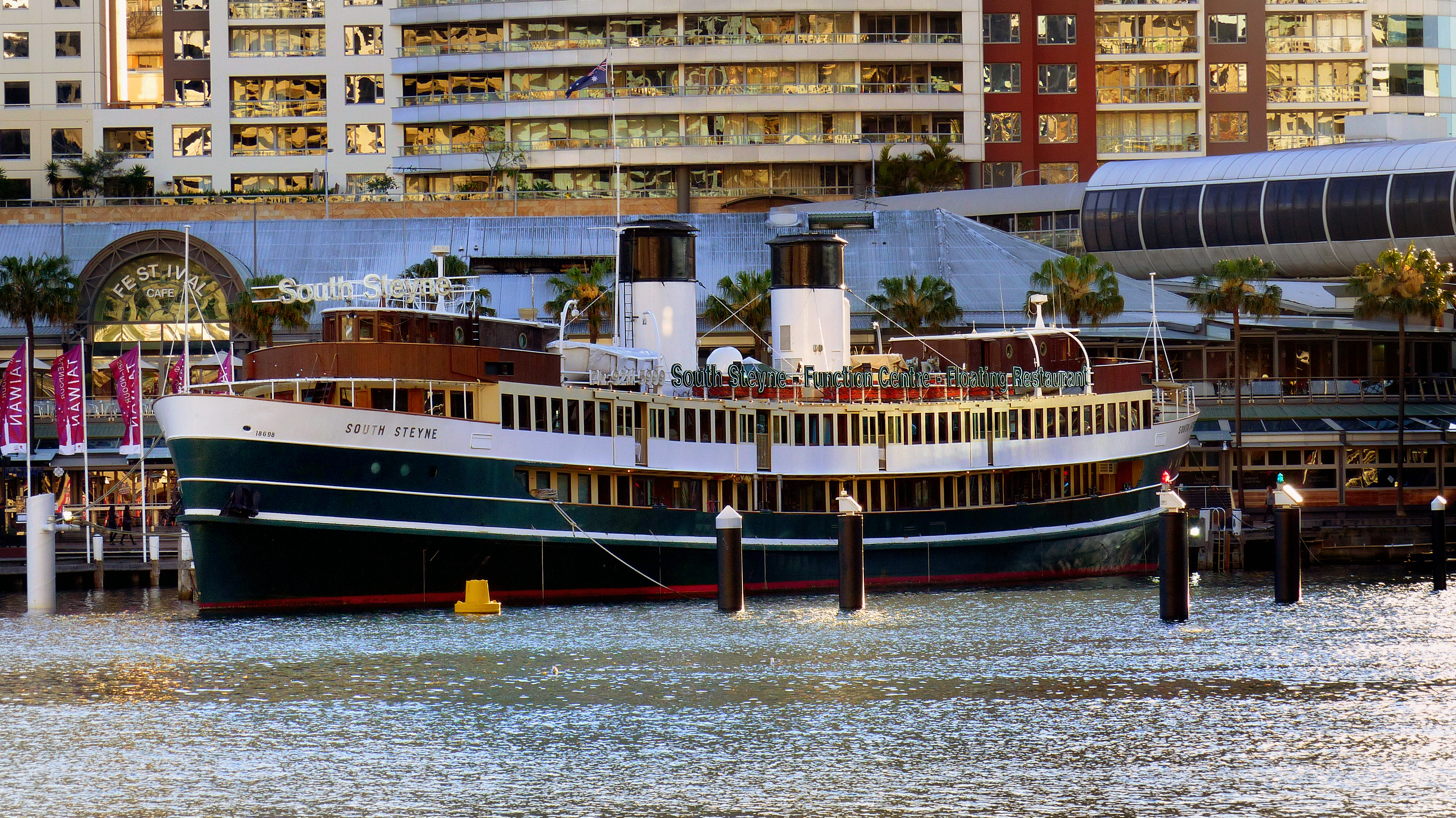
Floating restaurant and function centre, Darling Harbour, 2015

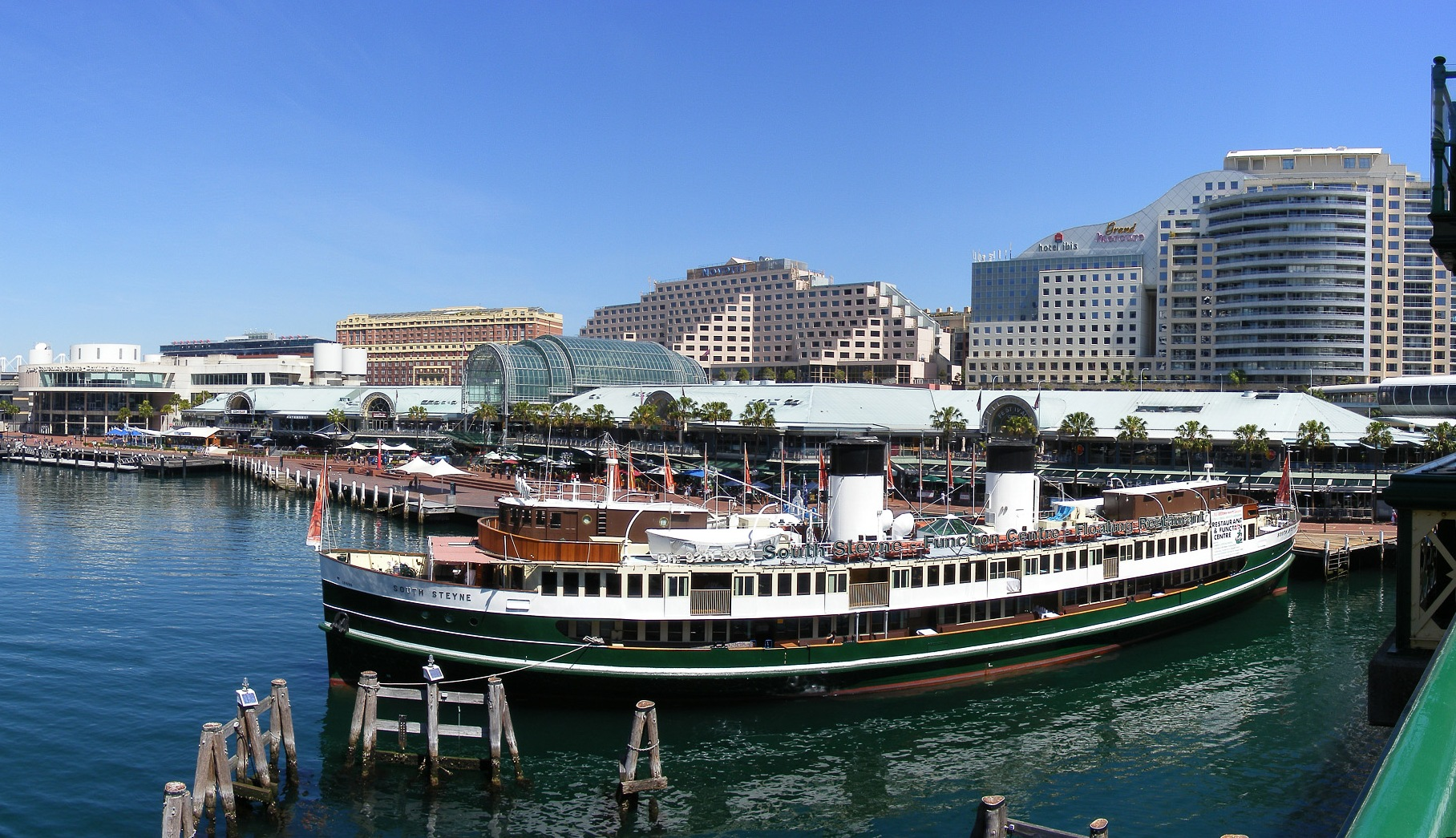
South Steyne at Darling Harbour

A group of concerned Manly residents formed a preservation society in 1975 with the slogan "Save Our Steyne". They were able to prevent the ferry from being towed behind an old aircraft carrier, and scrapped in Hong Kong. The major damage in the fan room was repaired, new light fittings added to the promenade deck, the funnels and promenade deck sand blasted and the whole ferry was repainted. Negotiations with the Public Transport Commission took place to allow the ferry to run two return, peak-hour services to Manly, Monday to Friday. However, running the ferry was very political and restoration of the boilers was hampered by the surveyors from the Maritime Services Board. Lloyd's Register offered to hold the survey for the ferry but she was soon returned to the vendors because repayments were not made.

The South Steyne passed through a number of ownerships with intermittent conservation and restoration work being undertaken. Restoration work began in 1987 at Rileys Hill Dry Dock near Ballina and later in Melbourne. In 1988 South Steyne was refitted as a cruising vessel/function centre and entered service in Melbourne; the former ferry's first function was as "royal yacht" for Queen Elizabeth II in April 1988. In 1991 the vessel was sold to a Newcastle owner and was returned to New South Wales, initially to Newcastle, then to Sydney, where the ship was moored in Darling Harbour as the 2000 Olympic Information Centre. The vessel was added to the New South Wales State Heritage Register on 2 April 1999. In April 2016 the vessel was temporarily relocated to Berrys Bay while the Darling Harbour wharf was rebuilt.

The vessel's owner, Brian McDermott, funded repairs and maintenance from the restaurant's takings, but his business was on hold until Transport for NSW can find a new berth. On the night of 18 August 2024, a barge moored near South Steyne was engulfed in flames, although South Steyne survived with minor heat damage. South Steyne (still in Berrys Bay) has been listed for sale in September 2026.

== Heritage status ==
"The South Steyne was the best known of the Manly ferry line which played a major role in the suburbanisation of Sydney and in the development of its recreational patterns. It is a very high quality example of naval architecture and an outstanding example of the plating (having no flat plates) for which Henry Robb of Leith was famous. It is the finest example of the most significant Australian contribution to sea navigation technology - the development of high speed, double-ended operation in deep sea conditions. It has an intact operating example of propulsion by steam reciprocating engine. It epitomised the Manly ferry as part of Sydney's image and its popular urban culture; and remains, like the Harbour Bridge, a powerful piece of Sydney imagery. It is held in high esteem by the local community and remains in the collective memory of the nation. It provides a working example of the propulsion and auxilary functions of marine steam power." (Heritage Office 1992) ...

— NSW Office of Heritage and Environment, Statement of Significance

South Steyne is listed on the New South Wales State Heritage register. The NSW Office of Environment and Heritage describes the ship's condition as follows:

As at 12 April 2000, the physical condition was good but with high level of maintenance required to retain this condition.
This vessel was built to very high standards of structural strength and is In excellent condition, though requiring a constant high level of maintenance to maintain that condition. Hull, machinery and exterior generally in original condition. The open shelters at the ends of the promenade deck were enclosed and the interiors were significantly altered in the 1980s. Both reversible at some expense. (Original detailed plans exist, held at vessel, at Heritage Office and other repositories.)

=== Modifications and dates ===
The following modifications were made since her construction:

- 1937 – keel laid
- 1 April 1938 – launched
- 9 September 1938 – arrived Sydney, registered
- 24 October 1938 – entered service
- 1944 – collision with Manly wharf
- 1953 – first ocean cruise
- 1964 – alterations to passenger accommodation
- 1972 – last ocean cruise
- August 1974 – withdrawn from service. Fire damaged
- 1975 – sold out of service
- 1988 – refit as restaurant/cruising vessel

=== Appearance in the media ===
The South Steyne features in Clive James’ poem Manly Ferry as he reflects on his Sydney childhood in the 1940’s. Clive James Sentenced to Life, Poems 2011-2014, Picador.

== See also ==
- List of Sydney Harbour ferries
- Manly ferry services, Sydney
- Sydney Ferries
- Timeline of Sydney Harbour ferries
