= Manly ferry wharf =

Wharf serving Manly in Sydney

Manly
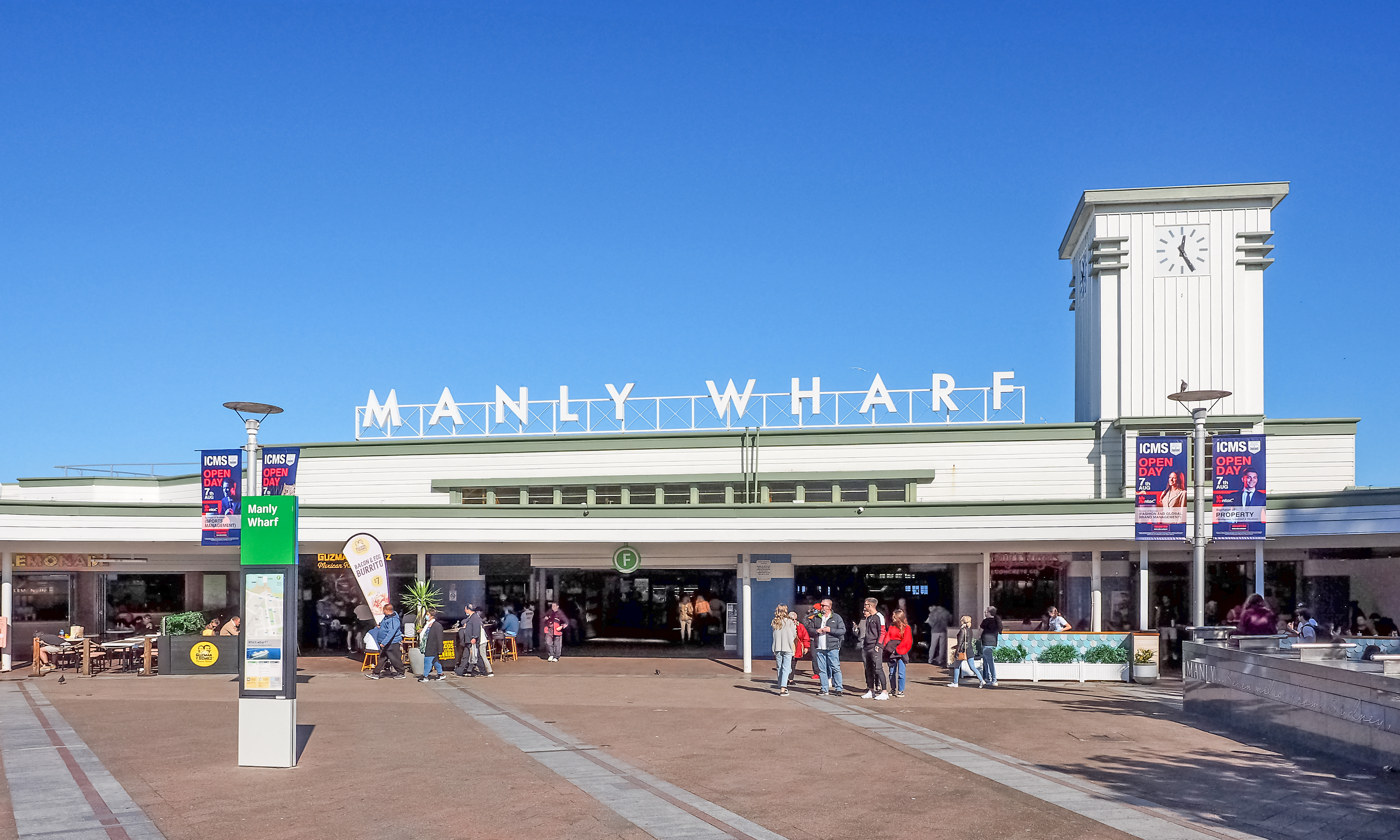
- The Esplanade entrance in July 2022

General information
- Location: The Esplanade, Manly; New South Wales; Australia
- Coordinates: 33°48′01″S 151°17′02″E
- Owner: Transport for NSW
- Operator: Transdev Sydney Ferries
- Distance: 9.5 kilometres (5.9 mi) from Circular Quay
- Platforms: 1 wharf (2 berths)
- Connections: Manly Wharf

Construction
- Accessible: Yes

Other information
- Status: Staffed

History
- Opened: 1939–1941

Services
Preceding wharf	Sydney Ferries	Following wharf
Circular Quay Terminus	F1 Manly	Terminus
- yes

New South Wales Heritage Register
- Official name: Manly Wharf
- Type: State heritage (built)
- Designated: 18 April 2000
- Reference no.: 1434
- Type: Wharf
- Category: Transport – Water
- Builders: Maritime Services Board
Location

Manly Wharf is a heritage-listed passenger terminal wharf and recreational area located at West Esplanade and serving Manly, a Sydney suburb in the Northern Beaches Council local government area of New South Wales, Australia. Since the 1850s, it has served as the Manly embarkation and disembarkation point for the Manly to Sydney ferry service.

The wharf has been redeveloped a number of times since the first structure was constructed in 1856. New facilities were added in the early 20th century, and it was rebuilt in a modernist style in the early 1940s, the basic form of which remains today. The wharf was added to the New South Wales State Heritage Register on 18 April 2000.

In addition to passenger services, a cargo service was also run to Manly until the 1928-opening of the Spit Bridge. Following the closure of the cargo service, an amusement park, Manly Fun Pier, was opened on the east wharf in 1931 which closed prior to the 1990 redevelopment of the wharf.

== Services ==
To the south west of the main wharf is the Manly Hotel Wharf also known as the East Wharf, which from a transport perspective is regarded as part of Manly Wharf. Services from that wharf are shown as operating from platform 3 in the services below.

The main wharf is served by Sydney Ferries and Manly Fast Ferry services to and from Circular Quay. The Hotel Wharf is served by Captain Cook Cruises and other Fantasea Cruising services around Sydney Harbour.

Platform	Line	Stopping pattern	Notes
1	Manly ferry service	Shuttle to Circular Quay	
2	MFF	Fast ferry shuttle to Circular Quay	
3	MDH	Hop on/Hop off service around Sydney Harbour; Manly – Darling Harbour Loop Service	
3	Captain Cook Cruises Harbour Explorer	Hop on/Hop off around Sydney Harbour	

=== Transport links ===
Keolis Downer Northern Beaches operates bus services from The Esplanade and Belgrave Street. In the 1980s, a bus interchange was built outside the wharf. It was demolished when the wharf was redeveloped and the stops moved further away.

== History ==
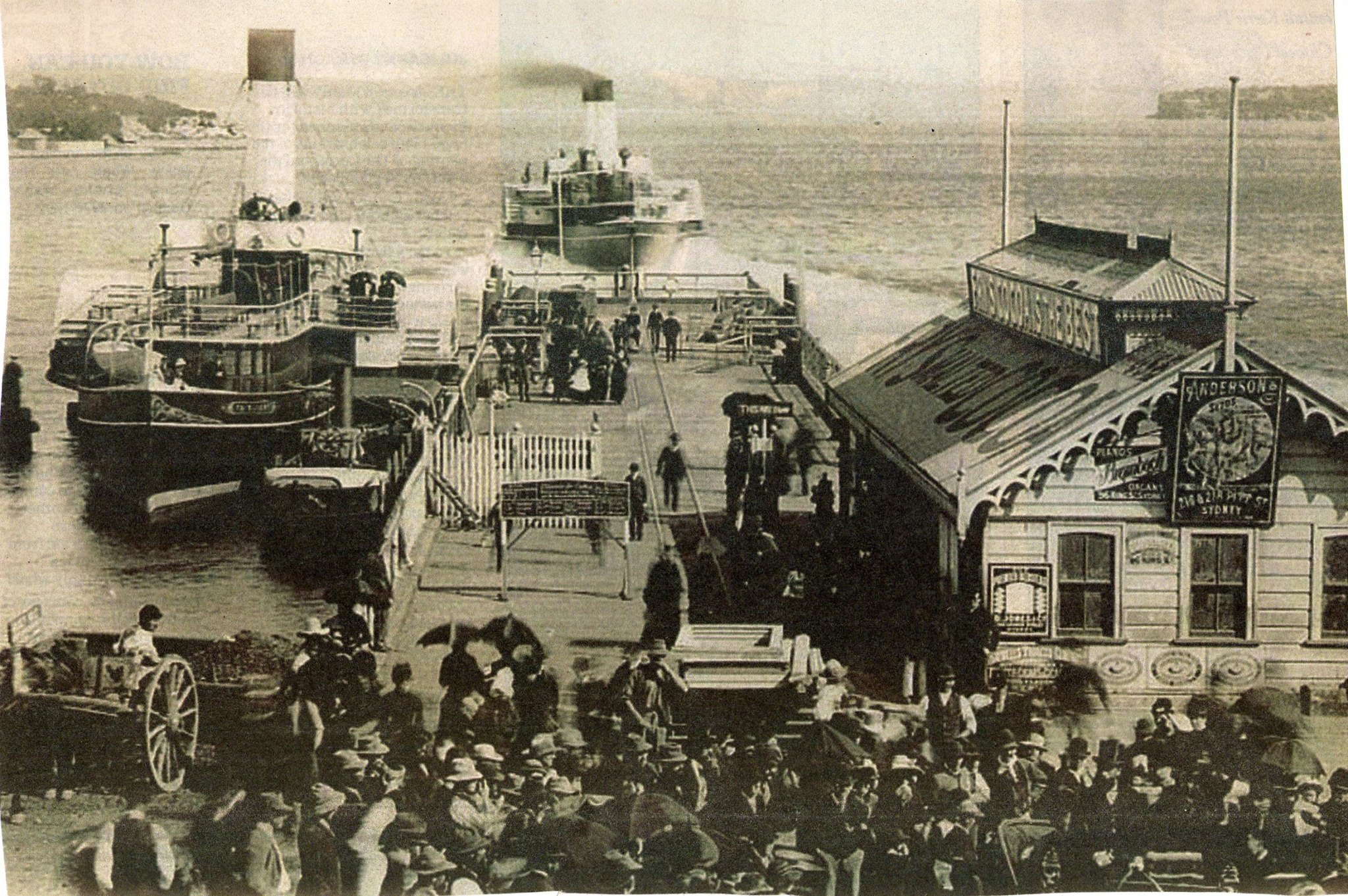
Manly ferry wharf circa 1890 - 1910 showing paddle-steamer ferries Fairlight (left) and Brighton

The first wharf was constructed in 1856 on the same site as the present wharf. Lumby (2016) says the date was 1855, and the wharf built by English-born merchant and Manly enthusiast, Henry Gilbert Smith, who envisaged the place as a seaside resort. Smith bought up land in 1853 and eventually acquired an interest in steam ferries serving the locality. As well as building a house known as "Fairlight", Smith was responsible for cottages, a hotel, church, school, pleasure grounds and swimming baths. He also had much to do with planting the first Norfolk Island pines (Araucaria heterophylla) on the ocean front.

In 1896, the first film ever made in Australia was Marius Sestier's Passengers Alighting from Ferry Brighton at Manly. The film, consisting of footage of the PS Brighton arriving at the wharf, premiered at the Salon Lumière on Pitt St (Australia's first cinema) on 27 October 1896. No copy is known to have survived.

Prior to the construction of the first Spit Bridge in 1928, retired passenger ferries were used as cargo carriers. Following the closure of the cargo service, an amusement park, Manly Fun Pier, was opened on the east wharf. The amusement park closed in 1989 and the two wharf structures were redeveloped in 1990.

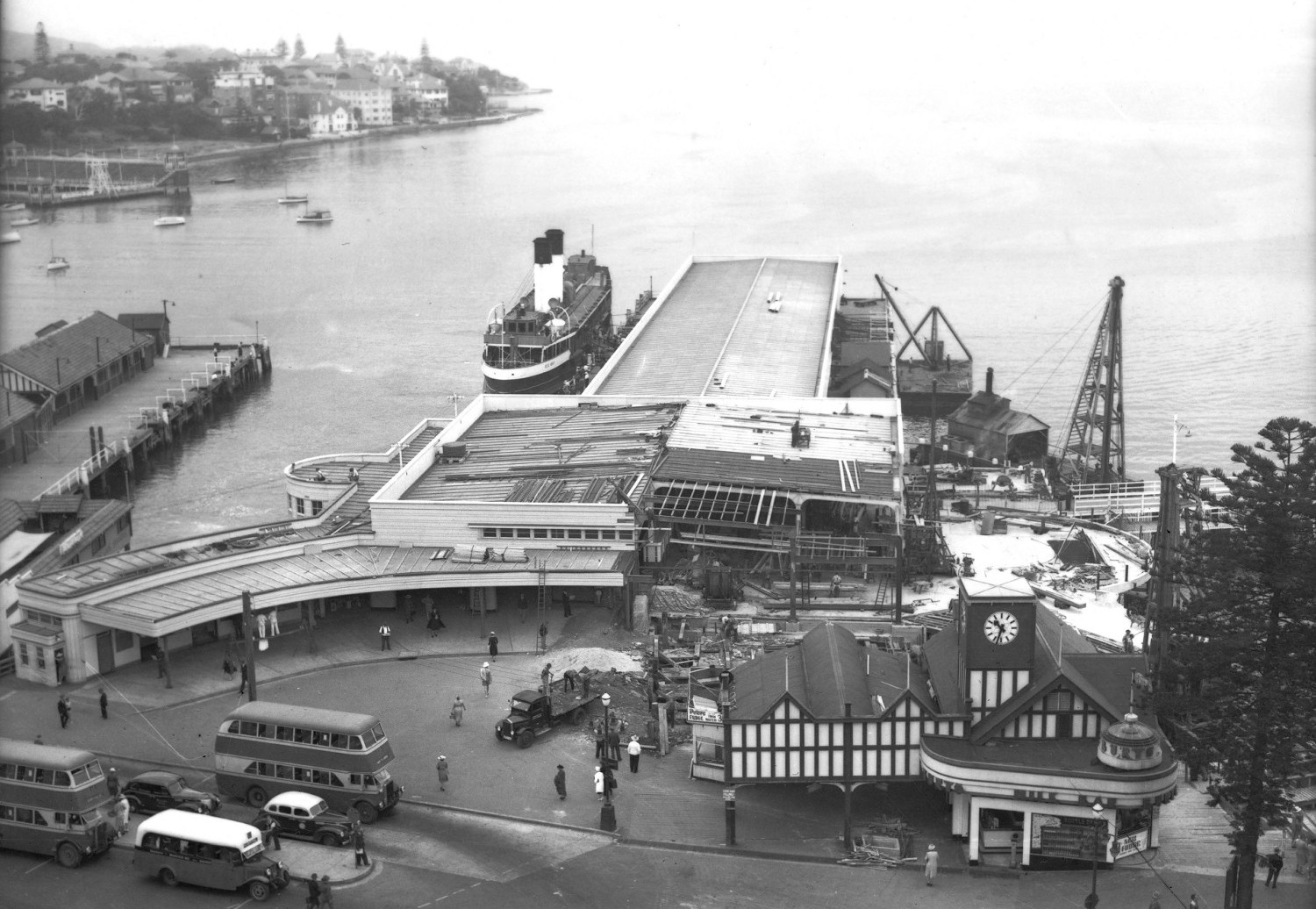
Steam ferry Dee Why approaching Manly Wharf, early 1940s which is being rebuilt. Image shows the older Edwardian structure being replaced by the current modernist structure. On the left is the east wharf which was a cargo wharf until 1928 and then an amusement park until 1989

Improvements were made to the wharf in the first half of the 20th century. These were swept away at the end of the inter-war era after the Maritime Services Board decided to construct an "imposing" new wharf during 1938 following several years of local agitation. A fire at the wharf in 1939 precipitated further action.

The Maritime Services Board engaged gifted young modernist architect Arthur Baldwinson (1908–68), not long after his return from several years working in England, to design major reconstructions of the ferry wharves at Manly and Circular Quay.

The wharf was built in a modernistic transport idiom with typical stylistic features of era such as play of circular and rectangular geometric terms, bayed facade to the water (marine connotations), wide arc plan at entrance, clock tower with "fins", flat roofing marked by wide fascia board. The current entrance was originally designed as a tram terminus and turning area. The structure was subjected to major alterations to the wharf wings involving a T-shaped clerestorey. The works were completed in 1941.

Until the mid-1960s, ferries docked at both sides of the wharf. When the Port Jackson & Manly Steamship Company introduced hydrofoils to the Manly service in the mid-1960s, a pontoon was attached to the eastern side to allow the hydrofoils to berth without their foils fouling the wharf. This was removed when the hydrofoils were replaced by JetCats in 1991. When the Freshwater class ferries were introduced in the 1980s, the western berth was rebuilt to accommodate their onboard gangways.

The wharf complex has a number of retail outlets and restaurants. In 2014, plans were lodged to add a second storey to the wharf.

The wharf was added to the New South Wales State Heritage Register on 18 April 2000.

== Description ==
A broad wharf supported on timber piers and with a concrete platform. The superstructure is constructed of steel and timber. The facade and side walls form an important architectural design, similar to the Circular Quay ferry terminals.

The original part of the wharf was built in a modernistic transport idiom, with typical stylistic features of era including play of circular and rectangular geometric terms, bayed facade to the water (marine connotations), wide arc plan at entrance, clock tower with "fins", flat roofing marked by wide fascia board. The current entrance was originally designed as a tram terminus and turning area. Timber clad framed structure opening and large internal spaces, concrete deck to west enclosed by "ship" railing. Some original shop fittings, signage etc. Subjected to major alterations to the wharf wings involving a T-shaped clerestorey.

=== Modifications and dates ===
Additions to the wharf include the hydrofoil pontoon c. 1968, and the more recent elevated platforms for new ferries.

Extensive refurbishment in 1990.

== Heritage listing ==
As at 11 April 2001, the wharf was considered of environmental significance as a visually prominent man-made feature; and of historical significance for its associations with the maritime activities at Manly as a tourist destination and suburb of Sydney, dependent on the ferry link to the CBD.

Together with Circular Quay, the wharf is the only substantial older style ferry wharf surviving in Port Jackson: association with Manly's history as a recreational centre.

Manly Wharf was listed on the New South Wales State Heritage Register on 18 April 2000 having satisfied the following criteria.

The place is important in demonstrating the course, or pattern, of cultural or natural history in New South Wales.

Of historical significance for its associations with the maritime activities at Manly as a tourist destination and suburb of Sydney, dependent on the ferry link to the Sydney CBD.

The place is important in demonstrating aesthetic characteristics and/or a high degree of creative or technical achievement in New South Wales.

Of environmental significance as a visually prominent manmade feature.

The place has strong or special association with a particular community or cultural group in New South Wales for social, cultural or spiritual reasons.

Of social significance as the ferry link to Sydney CBD by commuters and visitors.

== See also ==
- Manly Cove Pavilion
