= Manly ferry service =

Ferry services on Sydney Harbour

F1 Manly

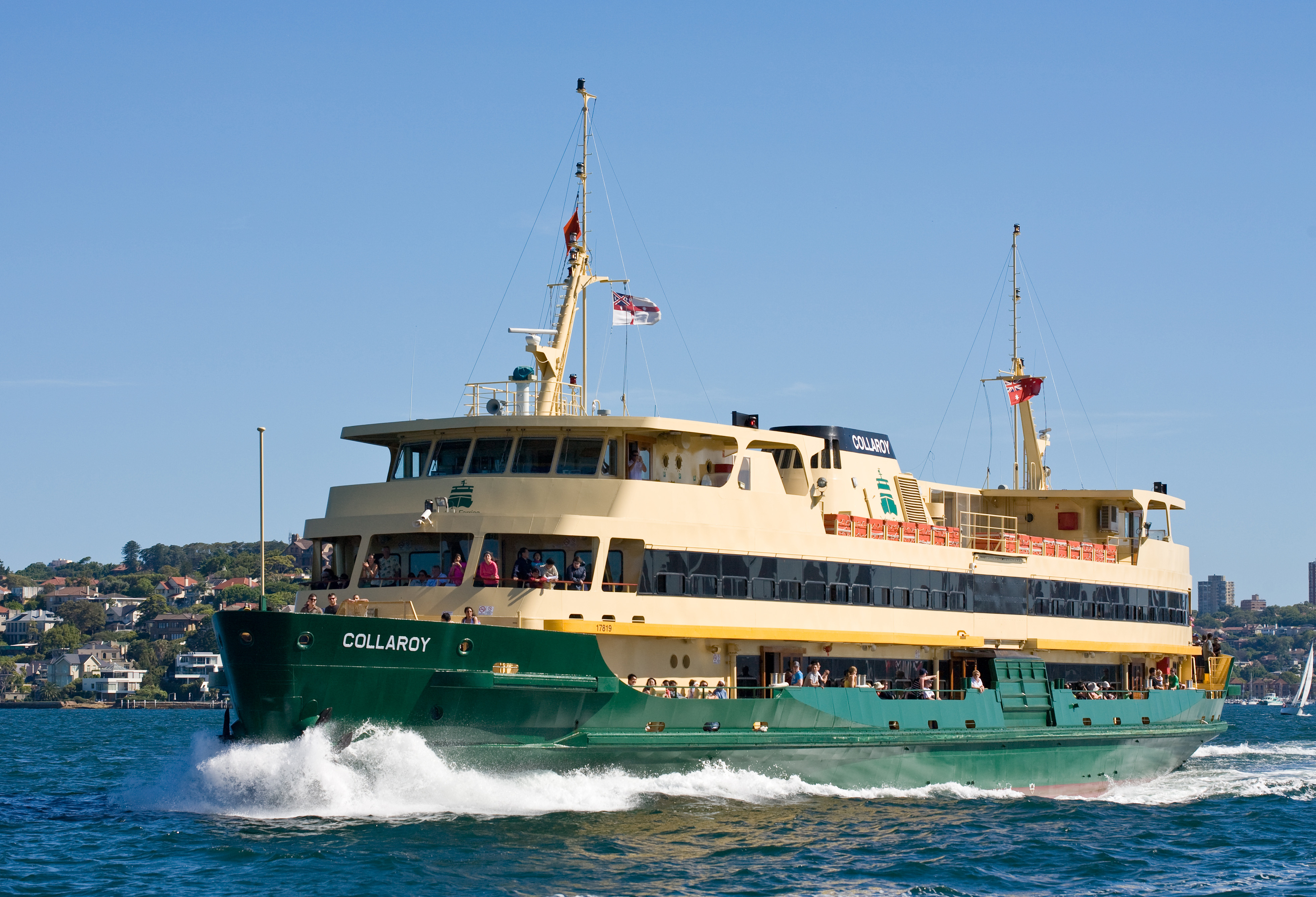
- Collaroy in November 2008
- Waterway: Sydney Harbour
- Owner: Sydney Ferries
- Operator: Transdev Sydney Ferries
- System length: 2 wharves, 11.3km (7mi)
- Travel time: Average travel time: 25-30mins one-way
- No. of vessels: 2 Freshwater class; 3 Emerald class (current), 3-4 Freshwater class (future)

The Manly ferry service (numbered F1) operates on Sydney Harbour, connecting the Sydney suburb of Manly with Circular Quay in the CBD, a journey of seven nautical miles.

== History ==
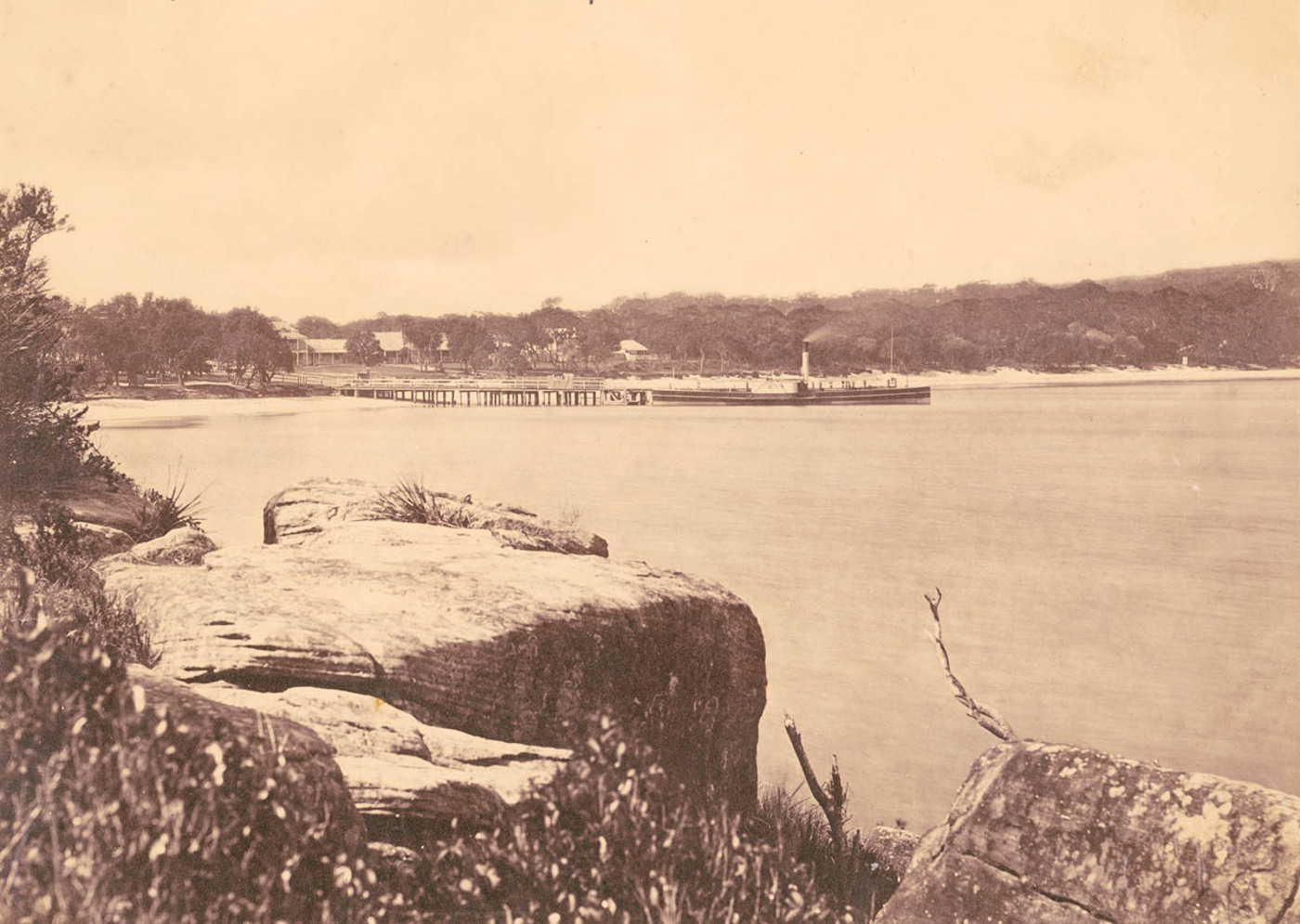
Paddle steamer at Manly ferry wharf circa 1870s

In 1853, Henry Gilbert Smith chartered the wooden paddle wheeler Brothers to bring people to the Manly area and thus boost the value of the subdivision of his land holdings near the Corso. The Manly area with its beaches and bays became a popular weekend destination and more ferries were chartered including by a local hotel owner. By 1855, the paddle steamer Emu (I) provided two daily weekday trips. Emu was followed by Black Swan and Pelican.

In 1859, the first double-ended ferry, Phantom, commenced the service. She was a success, and the double-ended configuration remains the standard on the Manly route through to the present-day. Weekends and holidays were even busier than week days, and extra boats and tugs were put into service often as charters, including Goolwa, Breadalbane, Cobra, Royal Alfred, and Manly (I). A new company, the Port Jackson Steamboat Company, was formed in 1876, and within a few years it was running British-built Fairlight and Commodore to Manly. In 1881, the company was reformed into the Port Jackson & Manly Steamship Company, and the biggest paddle steamer ferry to ever operate on the harbour, the opulent Brighton, was commissioned by the company in 1883.

With fares at one shilling for a single, in 1892 the Port Jackson Steamship Company announced a fare increase. In response, some Manly residents formed their own competing company, The Manly Co-operative Steam Ferry Company, which ran chartered steamers at sixpence a single. The Port Jackson company dropped their fares to threepence which was matched by the Co-op. Neither company was profitable at this price, so in 1896 they amalgamated to form the Port Jackson Co-operative Steamship Company. Renowned naval architect, Walter Reeks, designed two new ferries for the service, that would be archetypes for all Manly ferries through to the current Freshwater class. Manly (II) (1896) was the first double-ended screw ferry on the run, and Kuring-gai (1901) was steel, double-ended screw steamer that in its appearance, size and capacity, was the first of the familiar Manly ferries of the twentieth century.

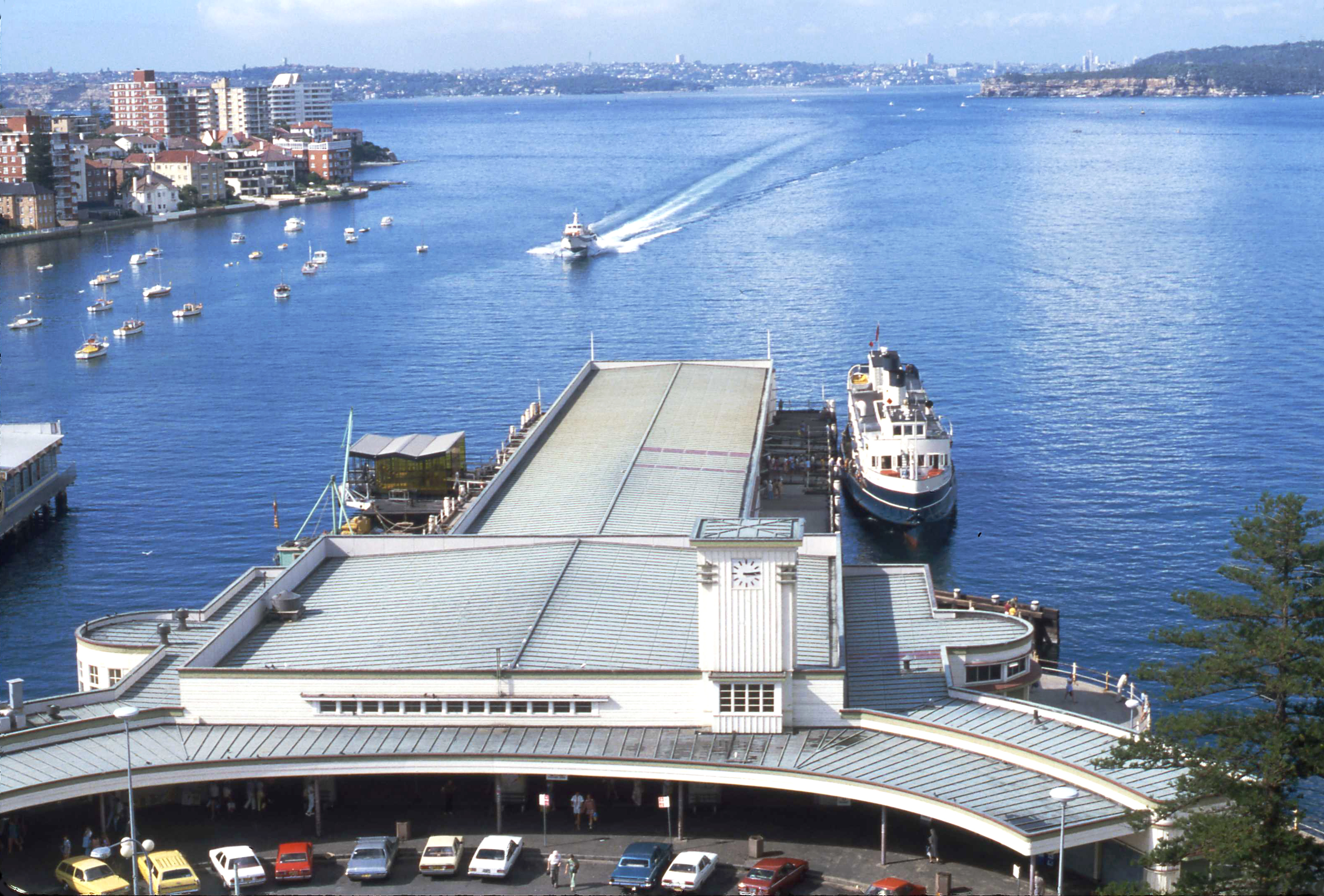
Ferry North Head and a hydrofoil, Manly ferry wharf, 1981

To meet the expanding demand, the company commissioned six similar double-ended screw steamers: Binngarra (1905), Burra Bra (1908), Bellubera (1910), Balgowlah (1912), Barrenjoey (1913), and Baragoola (1922). Prior to the construction of the first Spit Bridge in 1928, retired passenger ferries were used as cargo carriers. In 1928, two new ferries built in Scotland, Curl Curl and Dee Why, were commissioned. They were the largest and fastest ferries on the harbour until 1938 when the Company commissioned South Steyne, also built in Scotland.

The three Scottish-built steamers and most remaining "Binngarra-type" vessels were pulled out of service over the course of the 1960s and 1970s as the Manly service and its vessels declined. The Port Jackson and Manly Steamship Company operated the service until it was sold to Brambles Industries in April 1972 and taken over by the NSW State-government Public Transport Commission in December 1974 along with the inner harbour services run formerly run by Sydney Ferries Ltd. In July 1980, operations came under the control of the Urban Transit Authority. Baragoola and Barrenjoey (later renamed North Head), were retired in 1983 and 1985 respectively upon the introduction of the Freshwater-class ferries which remain in service. In January 1989, the service came under the control of the State Transit Authority and in 2004 Sydney Ferries.

In the mid-1960s hydrofoil services were introduced to complement the traditional ferries. They halved the travel time of the ferries but had significantly higher fares. The hydrofoils were replaced in 1990 by JetCats; however, these proved unreliable and expensive. The JetCats high speed service was discontinued on 31 December 2008 and replaced with a privately owned service operated by Manly Fast Ferry. In March 2010, the government announced that that Manly Fast Ferries contract had not been renewed. Instead another private operator, Sydney Fast Ferries, was awarded a five-year contract from 1 April 2010. However, both operators continued to operate services between Circular Quay and Manly. During 2014 Transport for NSW put out a tender for a combined service to commence during 2015 with Bass & Flinders Cruises, SeaLink Travel Group, Sydney Fast Ferries and Transit Systems responding. On 13 December 2014, it was announced that Manly Fast Ferries had won back the rights to operate the service, with a new contract which commenced on 1 April 2015.

In 2013, the Manly Ferry was given the designation F1 as part of a program to number all lines of the Sydney Ferries, Sydney Trains and light rail networks.

In 2019, Transport for NSW announced they would be retiring the Freshwater class as early as 2020, and replace them with three new Emerald-class ferries to provide more frequent services. The three Emerald-class ferries are named Clontarf, Balmoral, and Fairlight as a homage to the suburbs of the northern beaches.

In November 2020, the Minister for Transport announced that when the new ferries are put into operation, the Collaroy would be retained in service until at least 2023 for weekend operation. On 14 January 2021 it was announced that the Freshwater will also be retained for future services. The Queenscliff was retired on 13 October 2021 just prior to the first Emerald-class vessels operating. On 9 December 2021, it was announced that Narrabeen would be given new engines and an overhaul amidst rumours about the vessel having been decommissioned or scrapped.

The Queenscliff was recommissioned in 2022 as a substitute for the Collaroy, retired due to "steering issues" and difficulty obtaining parts. As of 2024, the government planned to replace all of Sydney's diesel ferries with new electric or hydrogen vessels by 2035.

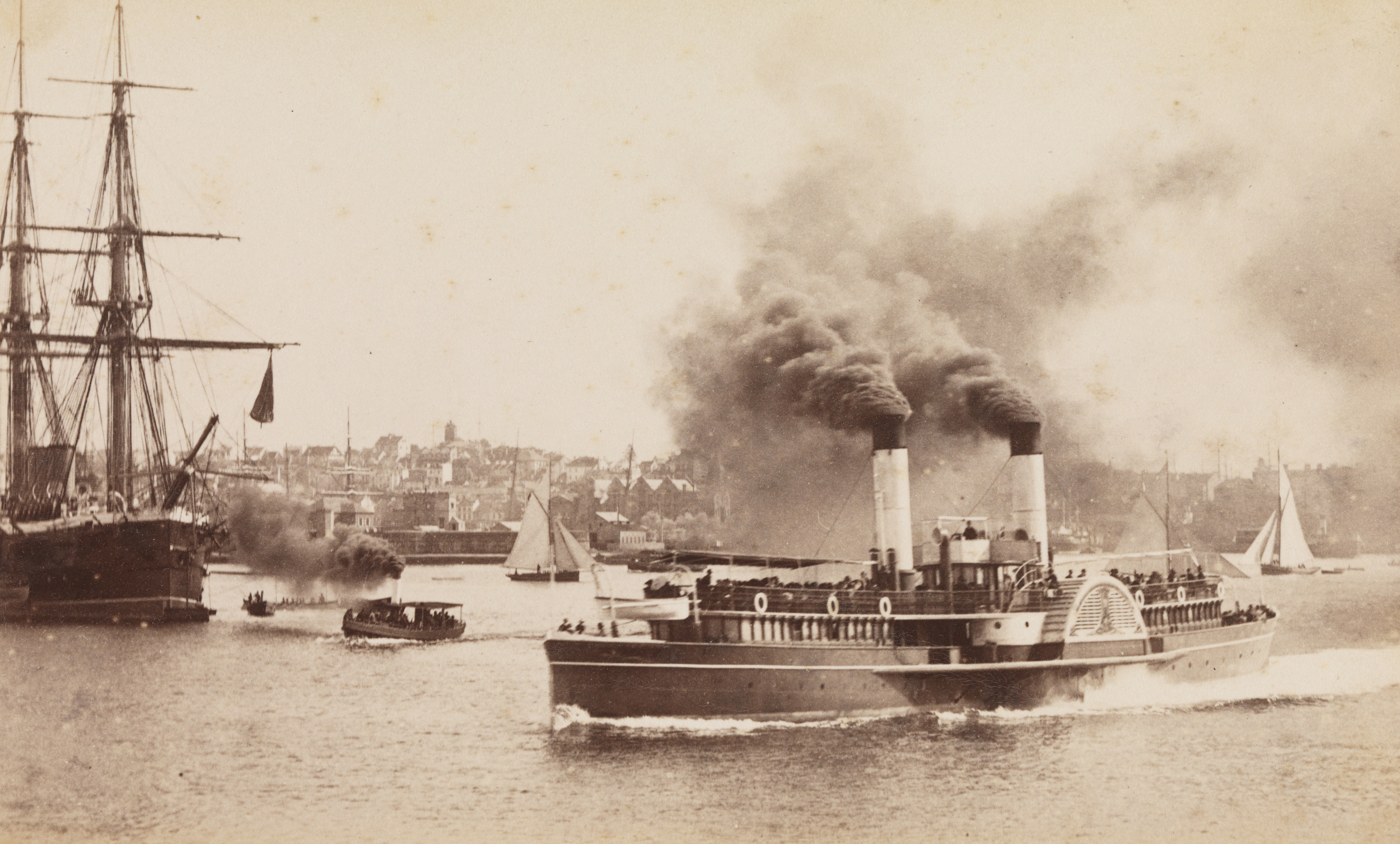
Brighton (1883–1916), the largest and last paddle steamer ferry on Sydney Harbour

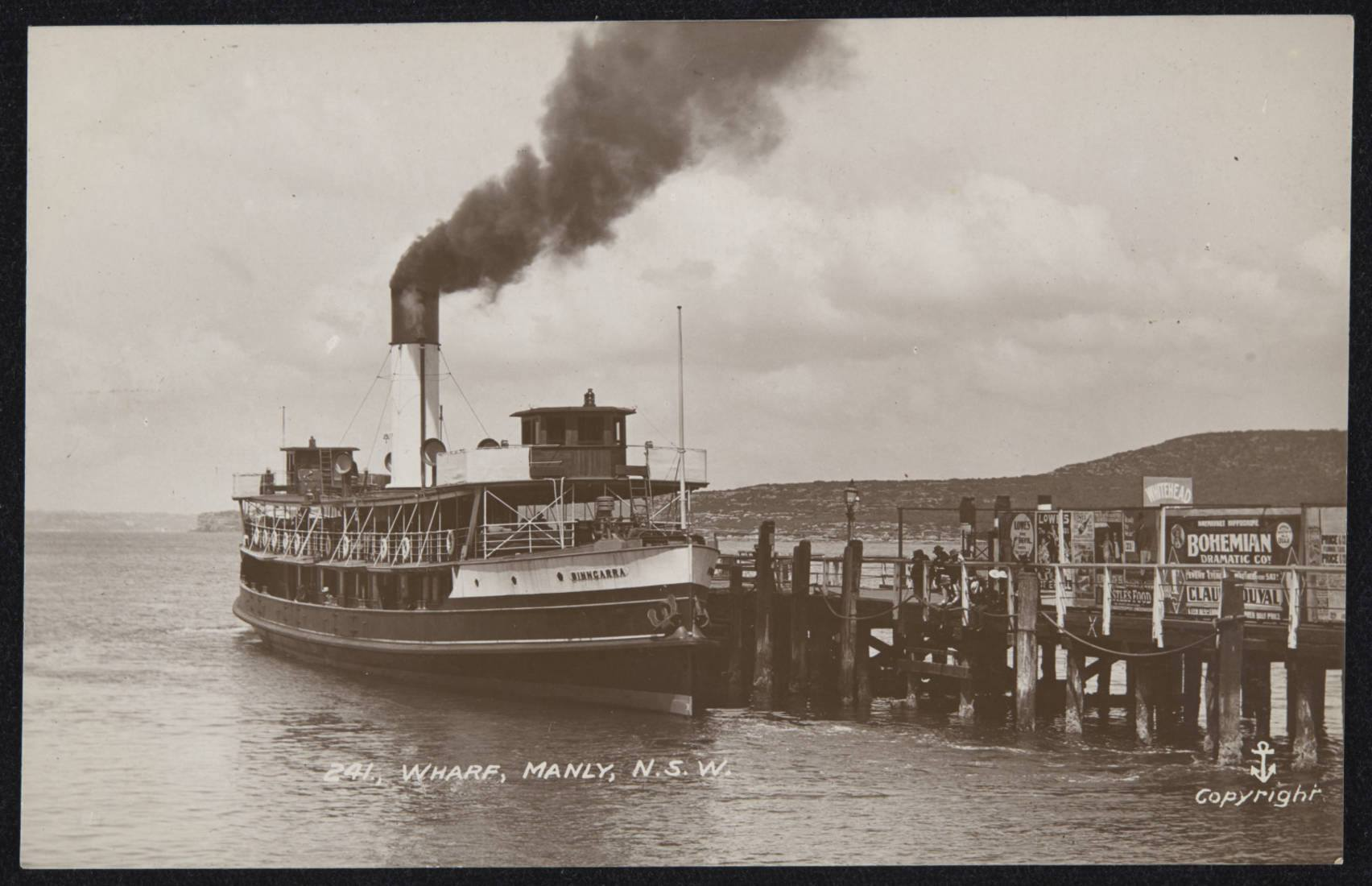
Binngarra at Manly Wharf, early 20th century

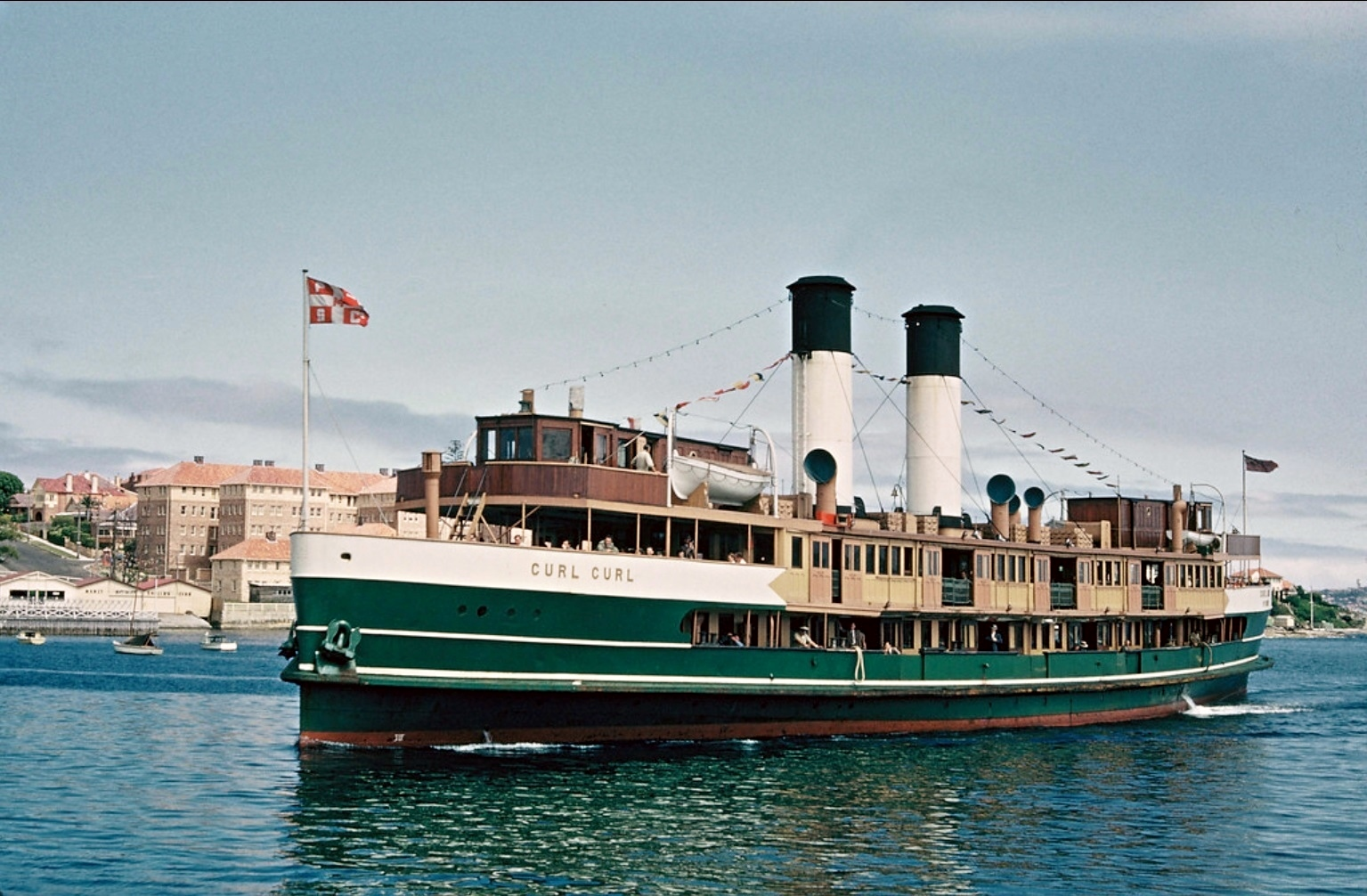
Curl Curl approaches Manly Wharf, 1950s

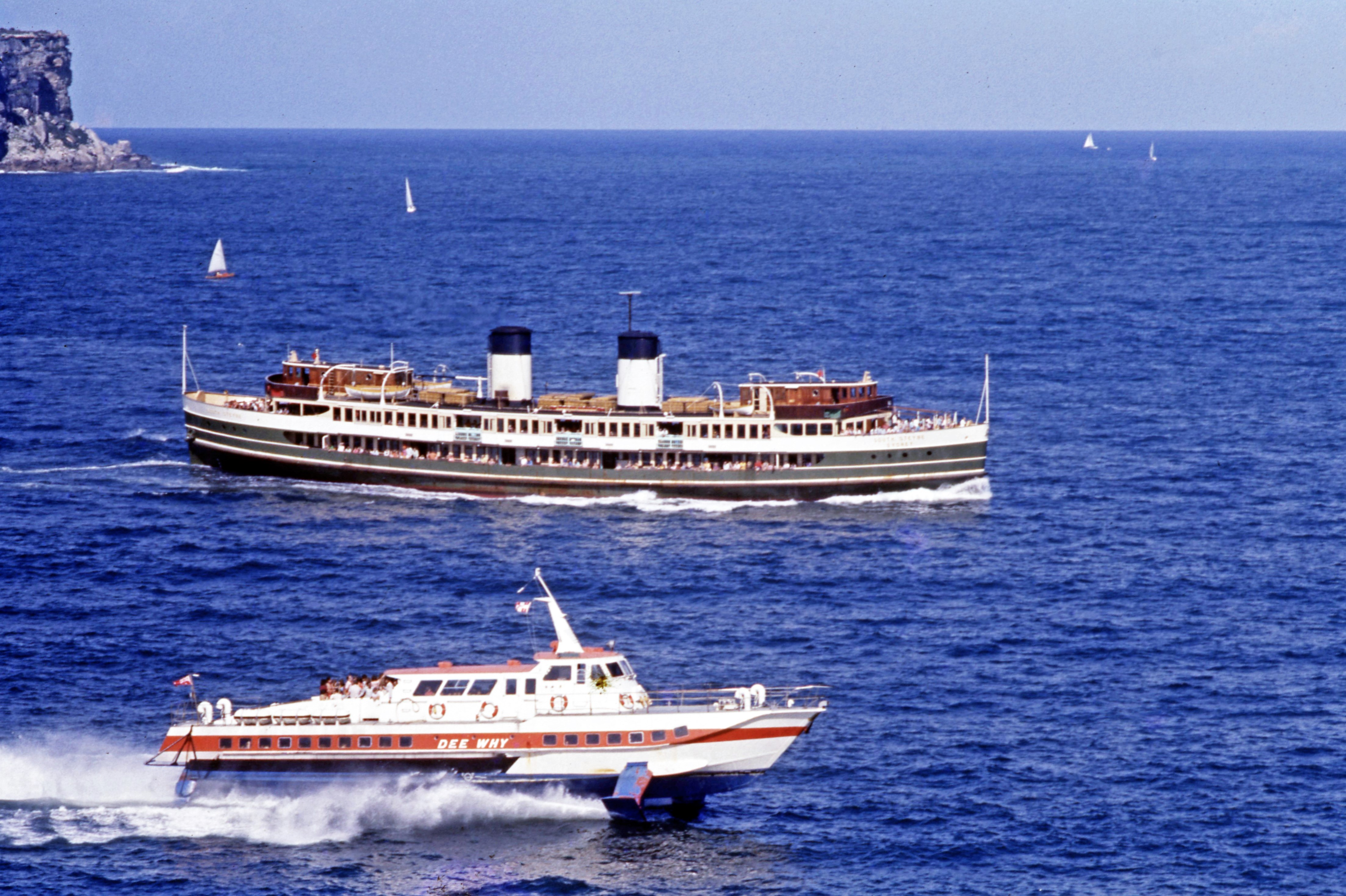
South Steyne and hydrofoil Dee Why passing North Head, 1970

== Operation ==
The Sydney Ferries network is operated by Transdev Sydney Ferries. Route design, timetabling and branding of the services is managed by Transport for NSW. During the Summer Holidays, the Manly Ferry runs to a "Summer Timetable" which provides additional services to cater for demand from increased tourist numbers.

=== Freshwater-class ferries ===
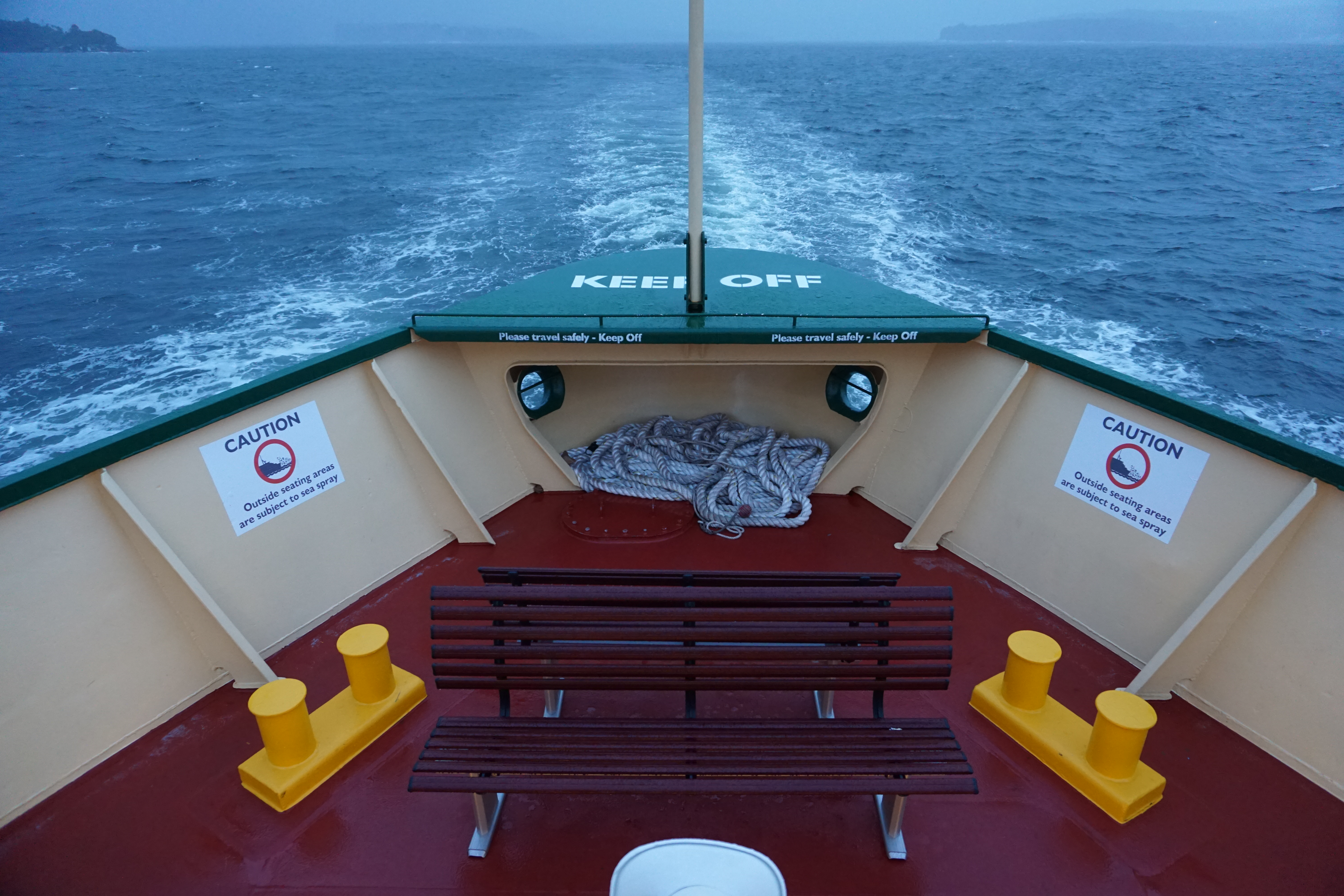
Manly ferry after passing Sydney Heads

The former Harbour City Ferries fleet of four Manly ferries are known as the Freshwater class and comprised, in order of commissioning, the MV Freshwater, MV Queenscliff, MV Narrabeen, and MV Collaroy, which were commissioned between 1982 and 1988. They were built by the State Dockyard in Newcastle and Carrington Slipways in Tomago. They are 70 metres (230 ft) in length, 12.5 metres (41 ft) wide, draught of 3.3 metres (11 ft) and they displace 1,140 tonnes (1122 Imperial tons). Their passenger capacity is 1,100 and their service speed is 16 knots. Emissions per person‐kilometre travelled are nearly the same for private car and for ferry.

They are powered by two Daihatsu model 8DSMB-32 turbo-charged diesel engines which each develop 2238 kW at 600rpm, and have hand-controllable pitch propellers. The hull and lower cabin area are of welded steel construction and the upper cabin and two wheelhouses are aluminium.

In 2019 plans were announced to retire all 4 Freshwater-class ferries and replace them with new versions of the smaller inner harbour Emerald-class ferries fitted with wave piercing hulls. Due to large public outcry and problems with the new Emerald-class ferries, two of the four Freshwater-class ferries (Freshwater and Collaroy) were saved from retirement. In October 2021 MV Queenscliff was retired. Later on that same year, MV Narrabeen was retired after a cancelled engine replacement as it would cost too much money. In 2021 there were plans to save Collaroy only, and retire freshwater, but it was later decided to bring Queenscliff back in service and retire Collaroy. Currently 2 of the Freshwater-class ferries only operate on weekends and public holidays however they have been seen operating when the swells are too large for the Emerald-class ferries to operate.

In 2023 it was announced that plans are under way to return all 4 Freshwater-class ferries to full-time operation, thus bringing Narrabeen and Queenscliff out of retirement and cancelling Collaroy's retirement. As of 2026, three of the four remained in service, with Collaroy set to be scrapped.

=== Emerald-class ferries ===
Three Emerald-class ferries currently operate the Manly ferry service. These vessels are named Fairlight, Balmoral and Clontarf. The Emerald-class ferries are a second series of an inner-harbour design fitted with wave piercing hulls to help them cross Sydney Harbour's heads.

The Emerald-class are expected to be removed from the run once a time table is worked out for at least three of the Freshwater class.

=== Wharves ===
Wharves served by the F1 ferry

==== Circular Quay ====
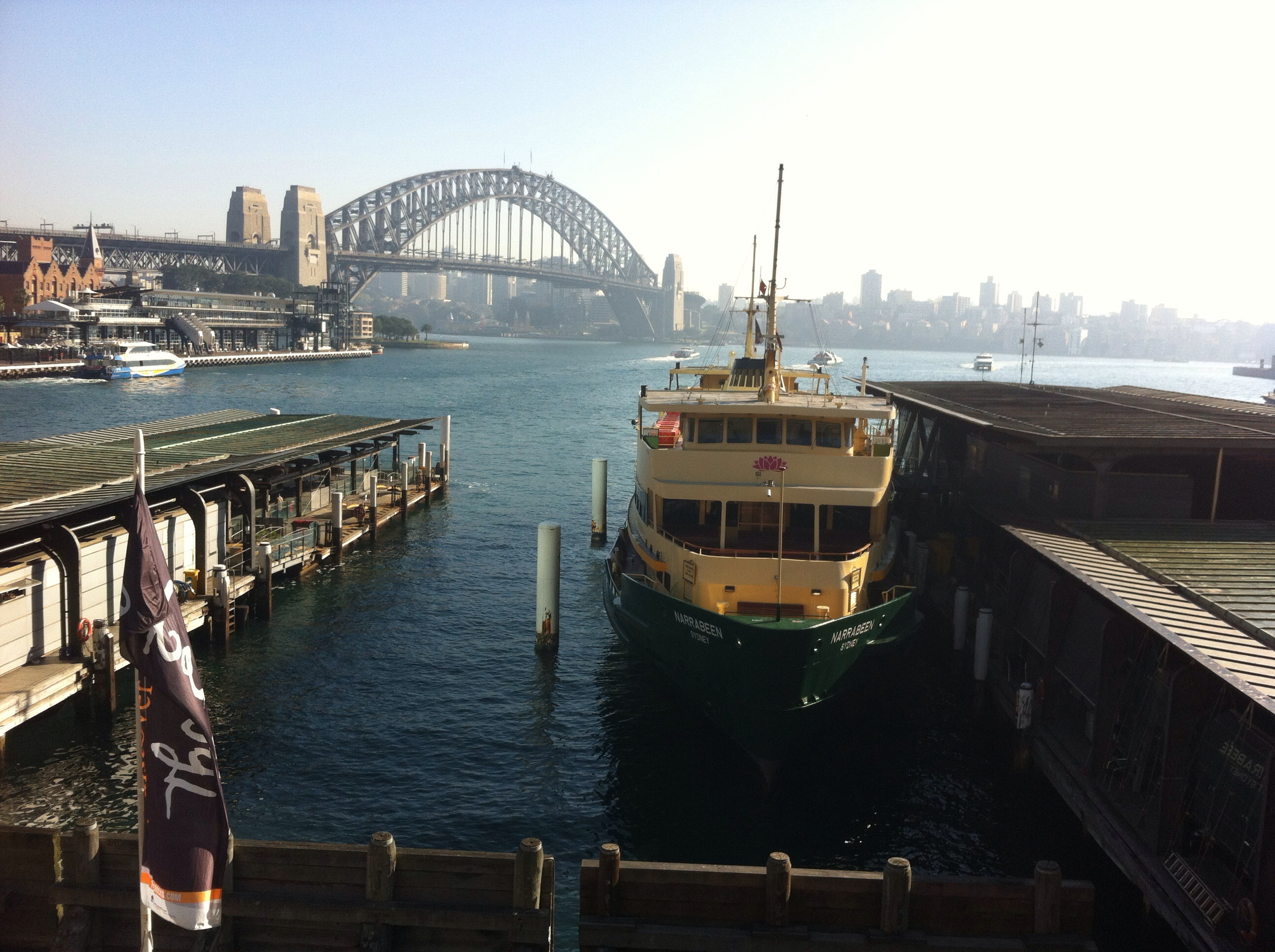
A Manly ferry at Circular Quay

Sydney Ferries services use Wharf 3 at Circular Quay for services to Manly. Wharf 3 is specially designed to allow for double-deck boarding and alighting, lowering dwell time for ferries.

==== Manly ====
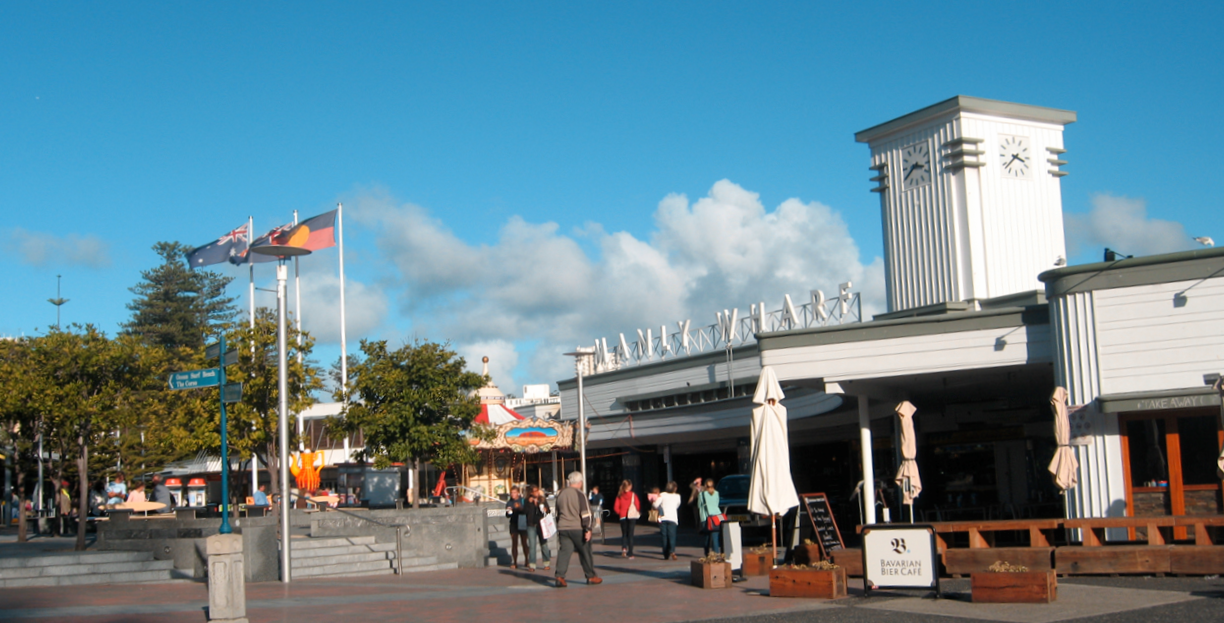
The Manly ferry wharf

Manly ferry wharf serves the suburb of Manly and is located opposite the harbour end of The Corso on The Esplanade. The wharf was designed to allow for double deck boarding on the A side of the wharf. The B side is used by Manly Fast Ferry for services to Circular Quay while Captain Cook Cruises Harbour Explorer use the Manly Hotel wharf also known as the East Wharf, just south east of the main wharf, for Hop On/Hop off services around Sydney Harbour with the former also operating a loop service to Darling Harbour.

Local bus services depart from stands in front of the wharf to many Northern Beaches Suburbs.

=== Patronage ===
The following table shows the patronage of Sydney Ferries network for the year 2025.

2025-26 Sydney Ferries annual patronage by line (Note: Figures based on Opal tap on and tap off data)
Manly ferry service	4,532,938	View source data.
Taronga Zoo ferry service	1,545,805	View source data.
Parramatta River ferry service	2,429,310	View source data.
Pyrmont Bay ferry service	2,779,319	View source data.
Neutral Bay ferry service	562,998	View source data.
Mosman Bay ferry service	709,762	View source data.
Double Bay ferry service	273,741	View source data.
Cockatoo Island ferry service	535,934	View source data.
Watsons Bay ferry service	1,873,854	View source data.
Blackwattle Bay ferry service	17,970	
