= Sydney hydrofoils =

Manly ferries in Sydney, Australia

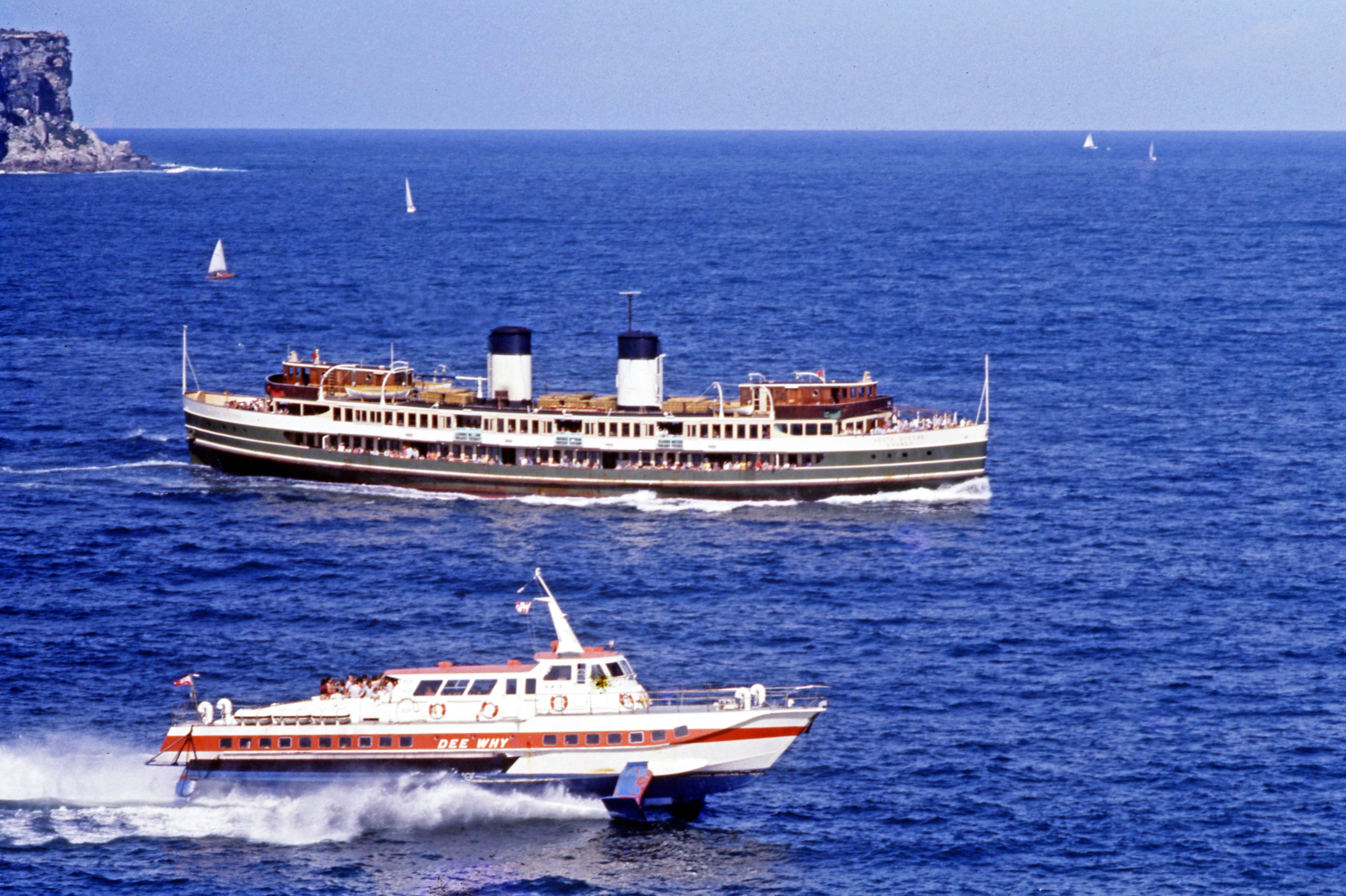
- Hydrofoil Dee Why passing the ferry South Steyne, Sydney Heads, 1970

Class overview
- Builders: Hitachi; Cantiere navale di Ancona
- Operators: Port Jackson & Manly Steamship Company; Public Transport Commission; Urban Transit Authority; State Transit Authority
- Completed: 8
- Active: 0
- Scrapped: 2

The Sydney hydrofoils were a series of hydrofoils operated by Port Jackson & Manly Steamship Company and its successors on the ferry service from Circular Quay to Manly.

The hydrofoils covered the 10-kilometre (6 mi) journey from Circular Quay to Manly in 15 minutes compared to 35 minutes for conventional ferries.

== History ==
By the mid-1960s, patronage on the Port Jackson & Manly Steamship Company's formerly lucrative Circular Quay to Manly service was declining. The company introduced a hydrofoil service halving the travelling time from 30 to 15 minutes but at a premium fare.

Introduced in 1965, the first hydrofoil was a 75-seat PT20 from Hitachi, Kanagawa named Manly. Despite early troubles with harbour debris, she proved to be a success and three larger hydrofoils were ordered from Italy through leasing arrangements.

The first of the three was a 140-seat Rodriguez PT50 hydrofoil, Fairlight, built by Cantiere navale di Ancona, Ancona and entered service in 1966. It would be joined by the Dee Why in 1970 and Curl Curl in 1973. These were joined by the Palm Beach purchased second hand from Macau in 1975 and the Long Reef from Italy in 1978.

In March 1973, Curl Curl was used on a hydrofoil service from Circular Quay to Gladesville, however, the service was short-lived due to river bank damage.

The hydrofoils, along with the conventional Manly ferries, North Head, Baragoola, and South Steyne, were taken over by Brambles when it acquired the Port Jackson company. The hydrofoils were profitable for Brambles as they were leased rather than owned outright. In 1974, the Public Transport Commission took over the Manly ferry and hydrofoil services, and the hydrofoils were purchased from a finance company in 1975.

In 1984/85, two 235-seat hydrofoils, Manly IV and Sydney entered service. The State Transit Authority replaced its remaining hydrofoils with three JetCats, with the last operating on 18 March 1991. The remaining vessels were sold for further service on the Mediterranean Sea. Fairlight, Dee Why and Palm Beach were scrapped at Homebush Bay in 1988.

== Vessels ==
Name	Type	Image	Official Number	MMSI	Year in service	Length		Seats	Notes
Name	Type	Image	Official Number	MMSI	Year in service	m	ft	Seats	Notes
Manly III	PT20		317480		1965	18.59	61.0	75	Builder: Hitachi. sold 1979 to Great Keppel Island, renamed Enterprise
Fairlight II	PT50		317902		1966	28.96	95.0	140	Builder: Cantiere navale L Rodriquez, Messina. Scrapped 1988
Dee Why II	PT50		343631		1970	28.96	95.0	140	Builder: Cantiere navale L Rodriquez, Messina. scrapped 1988
Curl Curl II	RHS140		355207	7232975	1973	28.96	95.0	140	Builder: Cantiere navale L Rodriquez, Messina. Sold 1992 to Ustica Lines, Italy & renamed Spargi, sold to Alimare
Palm Beach	PT50				1975	28.96	95.0	140	Builder: Cantiere navale L Rodriquez, Messina. ex Patane, second-hand from Macau, built 1970
Long Reef	PT50				1978	28.96	95.0	140	Builder: Cantiere navale L Rodriquez, Messina. second-hand from Italy, built 1967 as Freccia di Mergellina, sold 1992 to Italy
Manly IV	RHS160F			8222290	1984	31.20	102.4	235	Builder: Cantiere navale L Rodriquez, Messina. sold 1992 to Naples, renamed Sinai
Sydney	RHS160F			8310982	1985	31.20	102.4	235	Builder: Cantiere navale L Rodriquez, Messina. sold 1992 to Naples, renamed Fast Blu

== Cultural influence ==
The Fairlight CMI, a pioneering digital synthesiser, was named for the Fairlight II, which was itself named after Fairlight, a suburb of Sydney.
