= MV Manly =

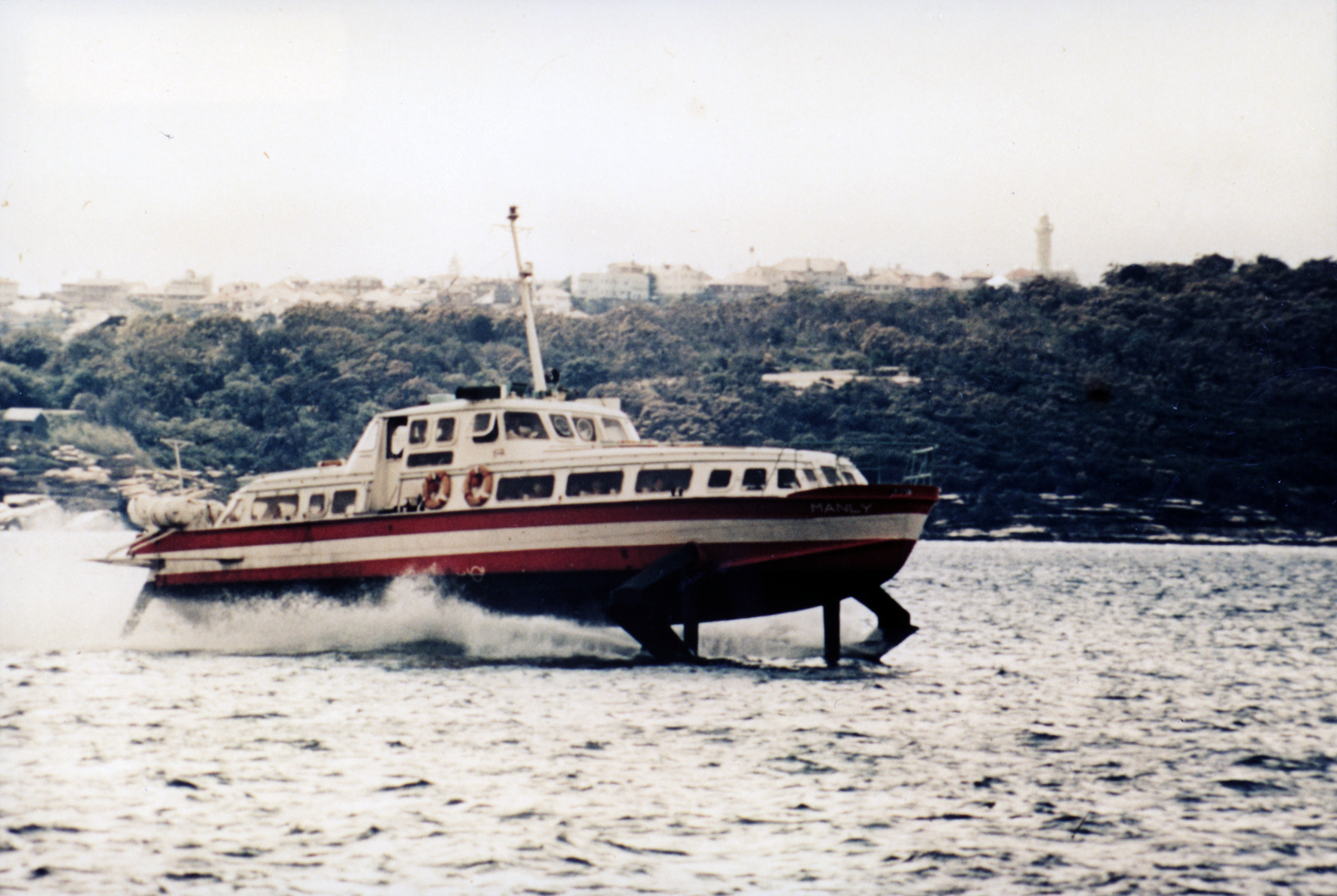
- Manly

History

Australia
- Name: MV Manly
- Operator: Port Jackson & Manly Steamship Company (1965-1972); Public Transport Commission (1972-1980)
- Route: Manly
- Builder: Hitachi Seawing, under licence from Sachsenberg Supramar
- Cost: £140,000
- Commissioned: 1964
- Maiden voyage: 1 January 1965
- In service: 7 January 1965
- Out of service: 1980

General characteristics
- Tonnage: 32 GRT
- Length: 18.6 m (61 ft)
- Beam: 5.85 m (19.2 ft)
- Speed: 34 kn (63 km/h)
- Capacity: 72 passengers

MV Manly was a Supramar PT20 type hydrofoil ferry which operated on Sydney Harbour from 1965 to 1980. It was the first hydrofoil to operate on Sydney Harbour.

== Design and construction ==
Manly was built by Hitachi in Japan under licence from Sachsenberg Supramar. The hull was constructed from aluminium and the foils from tempered steel. It arrived in Sydney on 30 December 1964 underwent a series of trials the following week.

== Service history ==
Manly commenced regular passenger services between Circular Quay and Manly on 7 January 1965. The journey took 17 minutes (9 minutes on foils) compared to 32-37 minutes by other ferries in service at the time. The fare on the high speed service was 3 shillings (about $3.80 in 2015 prices) more than on regular ferries.

The PT20's propellers had a design fault and were replaced by the manufacturer in 1968.

After larger hydrofoils were delivered, in 1973 Manly operated a new service between Circular Quay and Gladesville. This service was withdrawn after only 6 months due to excessive noise when operating on the Parramatta River and the lack of backup vessel. Manly was then kept in reserve for other hydrofoils.

The hydrofoils were expensive to operate and prone to mechanical failures. Manly was withdrawn in 1980 and laid up in Neutral Bay.

== Fate ==
Manly was sold to Hydrofoil Seaflight Services Pty Ltd in Queensland and renamed Enterprise for use between Rosslyn Bay and Great Keppel Island. The service was unsuccessful and Enterprise was sold to a private owner. The new owner removed the foils and engine, and the hull was laid up in Rosslyn Bay for several years. The hull was transported to Mildura in 1991 where it was intended to be used as a floating restaurant. In 1995 the hull was transported to a private property north of Sydney for conversion to a private cruise boat. It remained there for many years until finally being scrapped on site with its alloy hull taken to scrap metal recycling.
