= Berrys Bay =

Bay in Sydney Harbour, Australia

Coordinates: 33°50′40″S 151°11′53″E

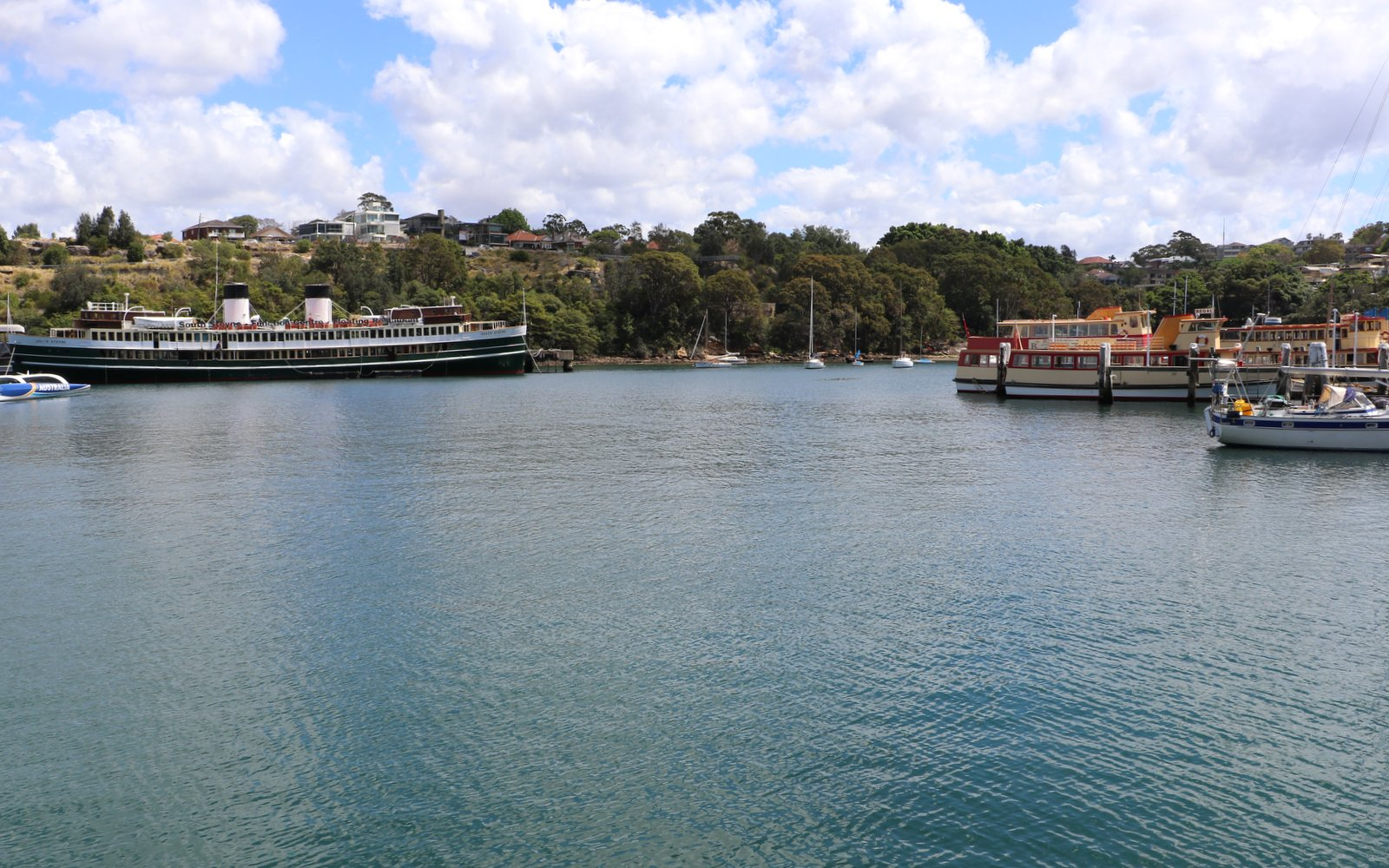
Berrys Bay and SS South Steyne

Berrys Bay is a bay located to the east of the Waverton Peninsula and the west of McMahons Point, on the north of Sydney Harbour, Australia.

A number of ship building firms operate from the bay.

== History ==
=== Shipbuilding ===
William Alfred Dunn (1839 – 1915) established a boatbuilding yard at Berry's Bay in the 1870s. In 1878 Dunn built Sydney's first steamer with propellers at both ends for the North Shore Ferry Company, for passenger ferry service in Sydney Harbour. Dunn's boatyard at Berry's Bay built ferry-boats, tugboats and lighters, as well as sailing boats and steam yachts. His sons, Charles and William Dunn, also became boatbuilders.

Walter McFarlane Ford (1841 – 1934) established a shipbuilding yard at Berry's Bay in 1878, which, over a period of 40 years, turned out a variety of vessels, including pearling schooners, island and mission vessels, surfboats and racing yachts and cruisers.

=== A maritime precinct ===
In 2008 the Government of New South Wales called for Expressions of Interest for the private sector to develop a maritime precinct at Berrys Bay. In 2013 Roads & Maritime Services and Government Property NSW entered into an agreement to lease with Pacifica Developments (formerly known as Meridien Marinas) to develop a maritime precinct at this site. No later information is available on this project.

In March 2021 Transport for NSW appointed a Berrys Bay Community and Stakeholder Working Group to help shape a fresh vision for this historic Waverton harbourside location. The group was scheduled to meet for the first time in April. In February 2022 ownership of the Qurantine Depot site passed to North Sydney Council.
