= Sydney JetCats =

Catamarans used between Manly and Sydney

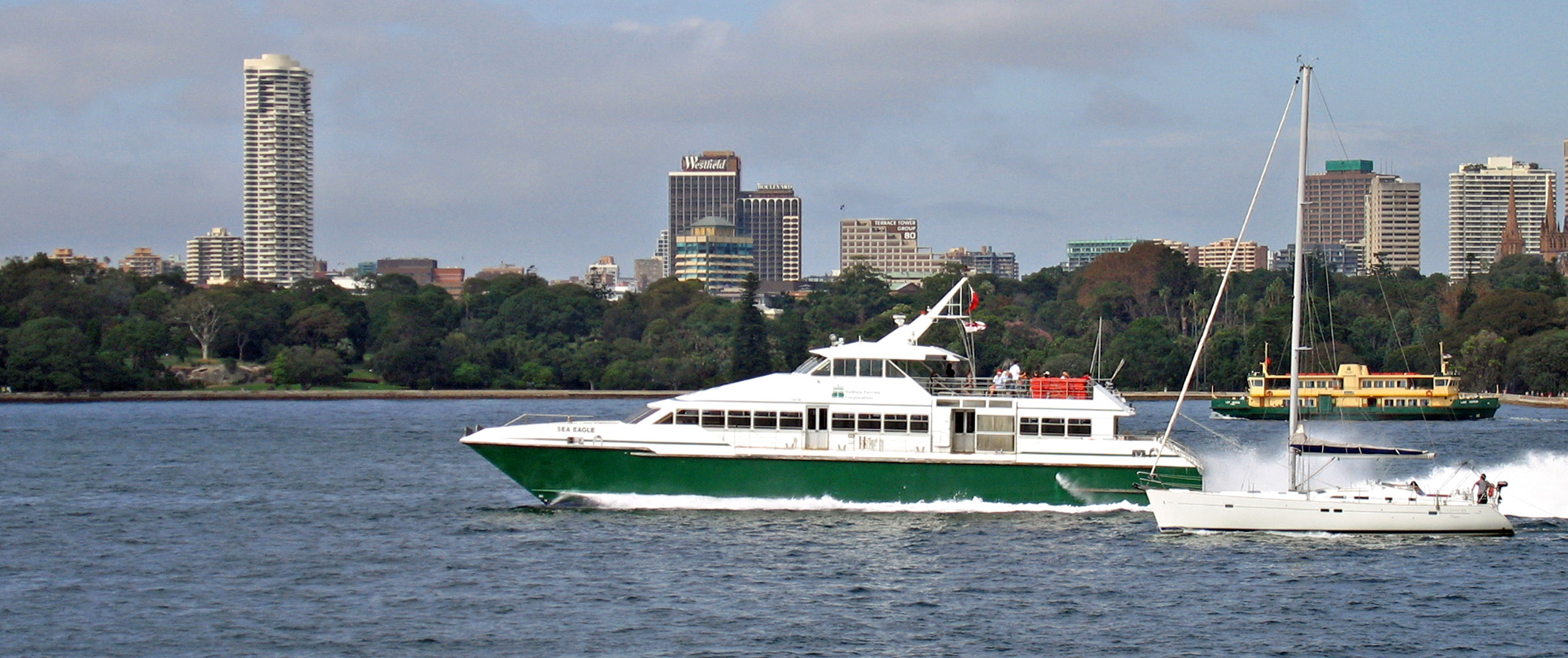
- View of the ferry Sea Eagle in Sydney Ferries Corporation livery

Class overview
- Builders: NQEA
- Operators: State Transit Authority; Sydney Ferries
- Completed: 3

General characteristics
- Type: Catamaran
- Length: 34.8 metres
- Beam: 10 metres
- Draught: 1 metre
- Propulsion: 2 x MWM TBD620 V16 diesel engines; 2 x KaMeWa 63SII waterjets
- Speed: 30 knots
- Capacity: 268 passengers
- Crew: 4
- Notes: Specifications published by the 2007 inquiry.

The Sydney JetCats were a class of catamarans operated by the State Transit Authority and Sydney Ferries on the Manly service. The three vessels entered service in 1990 and 1991, replacing the route's hydrofoils. They provided a high-speed service between Circular Quay and Manly until 31 December 2008, and were subsequently sold for overseas service.

== History ==
=== Introduction ===
Three JetCats were delivered in 1990/91 to replace the remaining four Sydney hydrofoils on the Manly service. The vessels were built by NQEA, Cairns to an Incat design.

The replacement of the hydrofoils had been announced by New South Wales transport minister Bruce Baird in 1988. Sir David Martin was originally to be named Dolphin, but was renamed in honour of the recently deceased governor Sir David Martin. The last hydrofoil passenger service was operated by Long Reef on 18 March 1991.

=== Service and refits ===
In 2007, the JetCat crossing between Circular Quay and Manly took 15 minutes, compared with 30 minutes for the conventional Freshwater-class ferries.

The relationship between the two services was examined by the Independent Pricing and Regulatory Tribunal in 1996. It considered them competing services and recommended reviewing their timetables to reduce competition. State Transit argued that demand justified retaining both the premium JetCat service and the conventional ferries.

In 2002, Sydney Ferries chose to upgrade the JetCats after withdrawing the SuperCats from the Manly route as a precaution during a safety review. Sir David Martin returned to service with new engines in March 2002. The re-engining program for all three JetCats was completed in the 2002–03 financial year. A ministerial answer to Parliament in 2004 put the cost at approximately A$6.1 million.

=== Withdrawal and sale ===
The 2007 special commission of inquiry into Sydney Ferries, conducted by Bret Walker, recommended discontinuing the JetCat service, citing operating costs and reliability. Commuter submissions supported retention because of the time savings and accessibility. The inquiry favoured a single, more frequent conventional Manly service and welcomed proposals for an unsubsidised private fast service.

On 11 November 2008, the State Government announced the cancellation of the JetCat service in its mini-budget. On 9 December it invited expressions of interest from private operators for a replacement service, to operate without government subsidy and with fares set by the operator.

The last JetCat service operated on 31 December 2008. It was operated by Blue Fin, which arrived at Circular Quay at about 10:30 am.

Bass and Flinders Cruises secured the former JetCat wharf slots for its replacement service. Manly Fast Ferry commenced operating the service on 10 February 2009.

The three JetCats were sold to International Broking Services in July 2009. The broker subsequently resold one vessel to South Korea and two to the Philippines.

In December 2009, Sydney Fast Ferries was awarded a five-year wharf-access contract for the Manly high-speed service and began operating on 1 April 2010. Manly Fast Ferry obtained permission to continue an alternative fast ferry service, and the two companies competed on the route.

== Design ==
The JetCats had welded aluminium hulls and superstructures, with an engine room in each hull. Their propulsion consisted of two diesel engines driving waterjets. The hulls were connected by forward and aft bridge structures, while the superstructure rested on rubber mounts to reduce transmitted noise and vibration.

== Vessels ==
Name	Date in service	Later history
Blue Fin	16 July 1990	Sold to SuperCat Fast Ferry Corporation and renamed SuperCat 36. SuperCat sold the vessel on 19 August 2021 for ₱2.5 million.
Sir David Martin	21 December 1990	Sold to SuperCat and renamed SuperCat 38; entered service between Cebu and Bohol in late 2009. Subsequently renamed St. Dominic. Sank off Talaga East, Mabini, Batangas, on 26 October 2020 during Typhoon Quinta. The Philippine Coast Guard assisted seven crew members, two of whom were injured. The owner retired the vessel from its fleet following the capsizing.
Sea Eagle	19 March 1991	Operated at Busan, South Korea, as Arcadia, before being sold for service in Kazakhstan as CM Jet 5. CMI Offshore announced its acquisition in May 2011 for a charter on the Kashagan project. By 2013 it was transporting offshore workers at Kashagan.
