= Manly Fun Pier =

Amusement park in Manly, Australia

- Interactive map of Manly Fun Pier
- Location: Manly, New South Wales, Australia
- Coordinates: 33.799265°S 151.284751°E
- Opened: 1930
- Closed: 1989

The Manly Fun Pier (or Manly Amusement Pier) was a small amusement park located on a wharf in Manly, New South Wales, Australia. It was in operation from 1930 until its closure in 1989.

== History ==
The Manly Fun Pier started life as a cargo wharf at Manly Cove in the 1850s. In 1927 the cargo wharf was closed and in 1930 it was reopened as the Manly Amusement Pier. and promoted with the slogan "Famed for Fun Since '31".

During its life, the Fun Pier saw a number of renovations (including a substantial renovation in 1980/81).

It was eventually demolished in 1989 when the passenger wharf was extended and redeveloped in 1989. The new complex opened in 1990 and had an amusement centre in the basement level which was operated by the American company TILT.

The amusement centre closed when the wharf was again substantially redeveloped in 2000.

== Attractions ==
At the time of its alteration in 1980/81, attractions included:

- Shark aquarium (the entrance of which was a large shark mouth)
- Dodgems
- Ghost train. The ghost train had a door which opened out to the water as the train approached, giving the rider the impression that they were about to plunge out into the water (until 1970s).
- Ferris Wheel
- Rock-O-Plane (until 1970s)
- Merry-go-'Round
- The Octopus
- Miniature Crazy train ride
- Tumbling house and slide
- Mexican Whip ride
- Scooter Boats (until 1970s)
- Mirror Maze (you would get a medal once completed)
- Sizzler
- Auto Cars
- Pinball Alley
