= SS Balgowlah =

Australian ferry boat

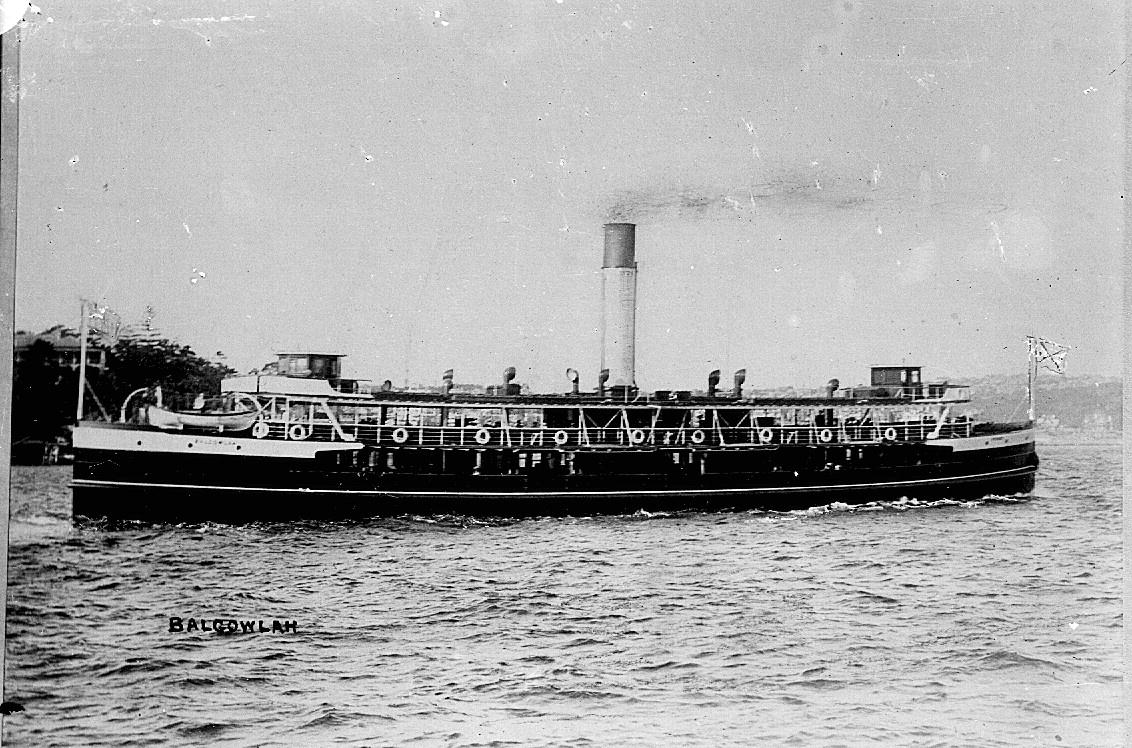
- Balgowlah on Sydney Harbour

History
- Name: Balgowlah
- Namesake: Balgowlah
- Owner: Port Jackson & Manly Steamship Company
- Operator: Port Jackson & Manly Steamship Company
- Port of registry: Sydney
- Route: Manly
- Builder: Mort's Dock, Balmain
- Cost: £26,000
- Yard number: 38
- Laid down: 1911
- Launched: 18 June 1912
- In service: 28 November 1912
- Out of service: 27 February 1951
- Identification: Official number 131538
- Fate: Scuttled

General characteristics
- Class & type: Binngarra class ferry
- Tonnage: 499 GRT
- Length: 64.00 m (210 ft 0 in)
- Beam: 10.00 m (33 ft)
- Draught: 3.75 m (12 ft 4 in)
- Decks: 2
- Speed: 15 kn (27.78 km/h) maximum speed
- Capacity: 1,517

SS Balgowlah was a ferry on Sydney Harbour operated by the Port Jackson & Manly Steamship Company on the Manly service from 1912 until 1951.

== Background ==
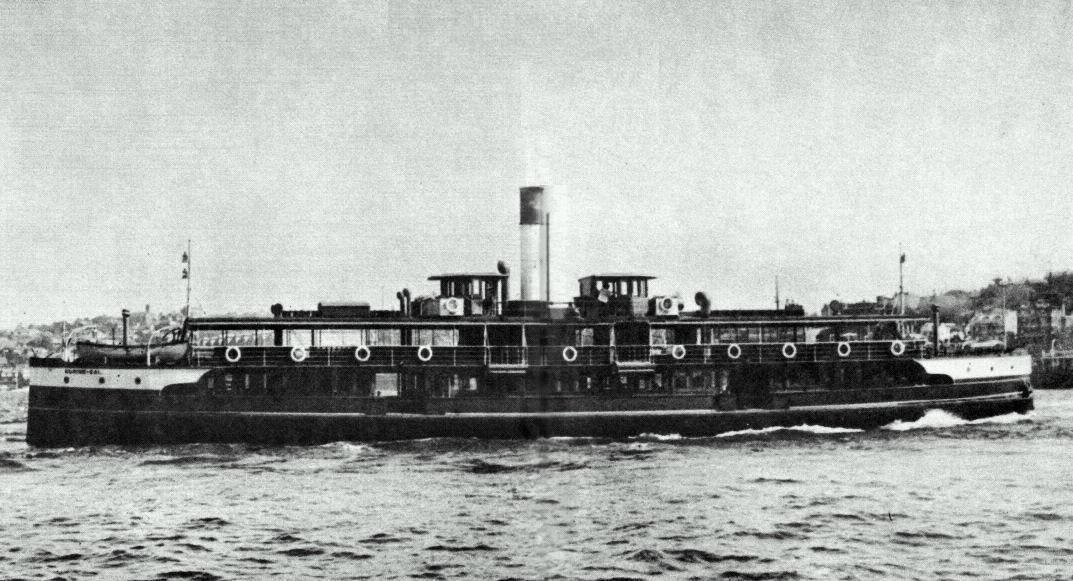
Kuring-gai (1901) was the forerunner to the "Binngarra-type" vessels including Balgowlah. Note the wheel houses located midships compared to Balgowlah's at the ends of the sun deck.

The Port Jackson & Manly Steamship Company's fleet transitioned comparatively late to screw propelled vessels and the fleet comprised mostly paddle steamers until the early years of the twentieth century. The difficulty of turning in the narrow bays of Sydney Harbour - particularly in the busy Circular Quay terminus in Sydney Cove - required the use of double-ended vessels. However, a double-ended screw configuration was particularly difficult for the fine bows that Manly ferries required for both speed and heavy seas. Further, a propeller at the leading forward end of a vessel reduced speed considerably. In the prosperous early twentieth century, this speed drawback was overcome by increasing engine size and power.

The first screw ferries on the Manly run were two innovative Walter Reeks–designed vessels; the SS Manly (1896), and SS Kuring-gai (1901), which were to become the fore-runners of the "Binngarra-class" ferries. They both had high forecastles at either to help her run through the deep-sea conditions across the Sydney Heads. The steel-hulled Kuring-gai was larger and she further refined the basic design to be similar to the subsequent and larger "Binngarra-class" vessels. Manly and Kuring-gai had both, however, followed paddle steamer design with their bridges around the midships funnels. Whereas the "Binngarra-class" vessels would have their wheelhouses at either end of their promenade decks.

The "Binngarra-class" ferries, Binngarra (1905), Burra-Bra (1908), Bellubera (1910), Balgowlah (1912), Barrenjoey (1913), and Baragoola (1922), were designed by Mort's Dock and Engineering, initially under the guidance of former chief draughtsman Andrew Christie. The first five were built at Mort's Woolwich yard and Baragoola was built at the Balmain yard. They were among the largest ships built in Australian yards at the time and, on the admission of Mort's executives, were built by the dock more for prestige than profit. Build costs were higher in Australia than in the United Kingdom, but this was offset by the cost of sailing them out to Australia.

== Design and construction ==
Balgowlah was built by Mort's Dock at their Woolwich yard for the Port Jackson & Manly Steamship Company for a cost of £29,000. Launched on 18 June 1912 and commissioned on 28 November 1912.

Balgowlah was nearly identical to the Bellubera and Barrenjoey and ultimately was the last coal burner in the fleet. It was capable of carrying 1,517 passengers in the summer and 982 in the winter (the highest capacity of this class) and made over 110,000 return trips to Manly covering about 715,000 nautical miles.

Provided with a triple expansion steam engine generating 122 hp, it was capable of 16 knots, one of the fastest ferries on the run and able to make the run in 25 minutes compared to the 30 mins of other vessels.

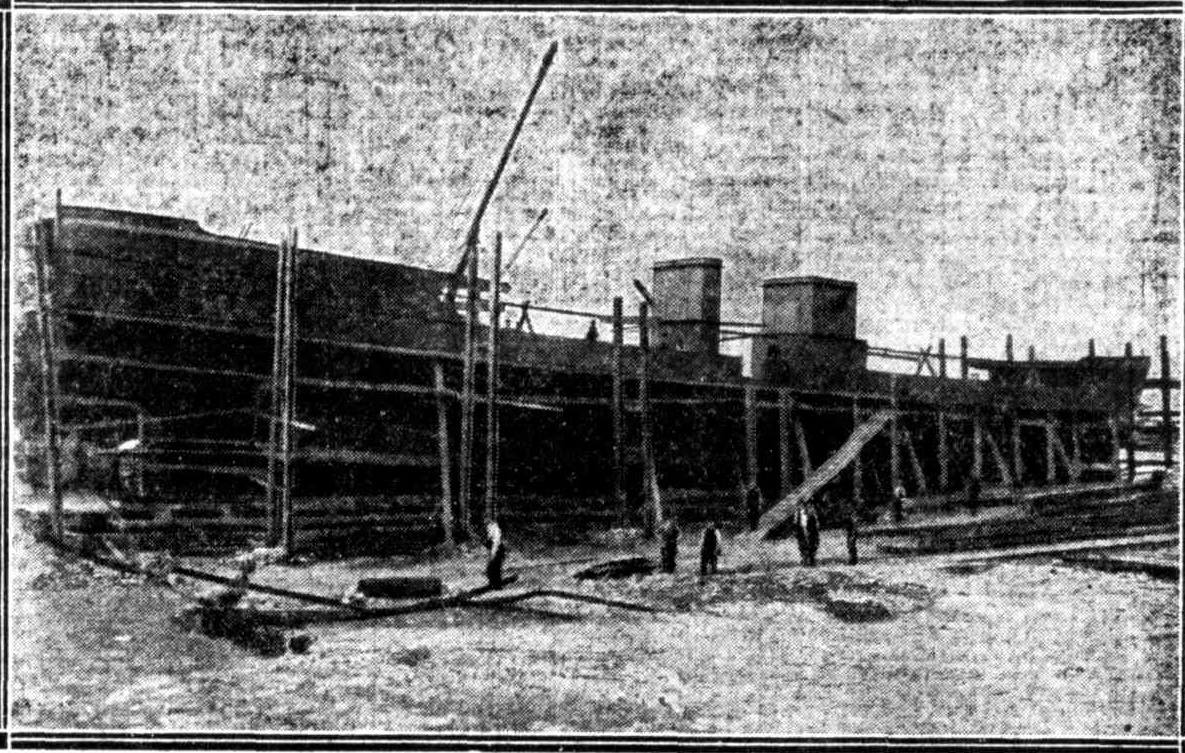
Under construction at Mort's Dock, Woolwich, May 1912

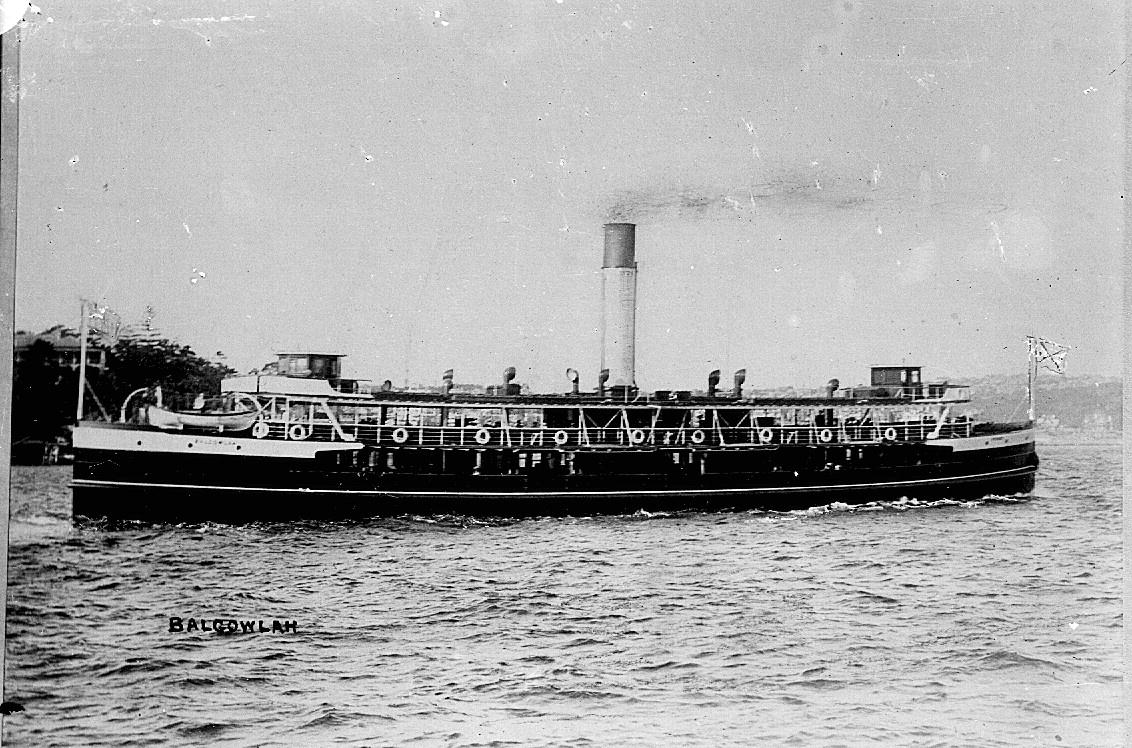
Balgowlah in close to her as-built form

== Operational history ==
Unlike some of its sister ships, it had a relatively uneventful life - shortly after going into service in 1912, it tangled with the collier Five Islands and caught itself in that ship's anchor chain. No damage was done. In 1927, it collided with Sydney Ferries Limited's Kanimbla at Bennelong Point. Steel-hulled Balgowlah received minor damage, while timber-hulled Kanimbla had a large gash torn in one side and came close to sinking. In 1929, it collided with the collier Birchrove Park, only minimal damage was done to both ships.

It scraped into the Sydney Ferries Limited's Kangaroo in 1913. Also in 1927, it collided with the Union Steamship Company's Manuka, losing around 10 feet (3.0 m) of its sponson. In 1939, it overshot the wharf at Circular Quay and went aground in soft mud. Although it ripped through the buffer stop, no damage was done. It took two tugs to pull it free.

The exorbitant cost and difficulty in replacing the large expensive steel-hulled Binngarra-type vessels saw the Balgowlah, along with the Bellubera, Barrenjoey, and Baragoola retained and significantly modified. In the 1920s, all four had officers' cabins attached to their wheelhouses. Beginning with Barrenjoey in 1930, and then in 1931-32 Balgowlah, Baragoola, and Bellubera over 1931-32, had their open upper passenger decks enclosed.

In 1946, it was decided that Balgowlah and Barrenjoey would be converted to diesel power. Barrenjoey was first, and re-emerged in 1951 as North Head. However, Balgowlah was never converted, the cost of converting North Head had left the company in grave financial circumstances and it could not afford the cost of reconditioning the hull. The engines purchased for the conversion were later placed in the Baragoola. Balgowlah was instead used as the company's relief vessel in the postwar years until North Head returned to service following her conversion to diesel. It made its last trip on the 08:05 to Manly on 27 February 1951 and was then laid up.

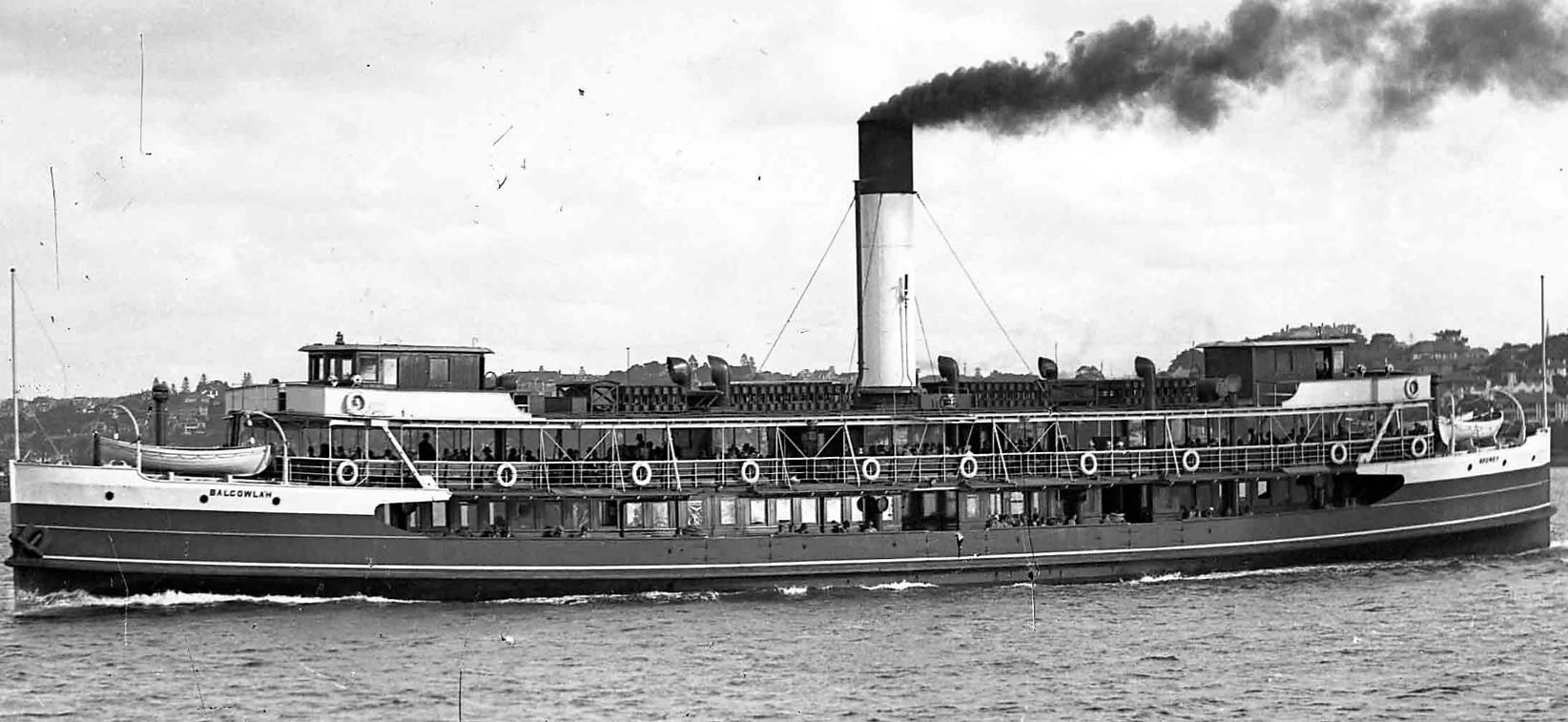
With extended wheelhouses and original open upper decks, ca 1930

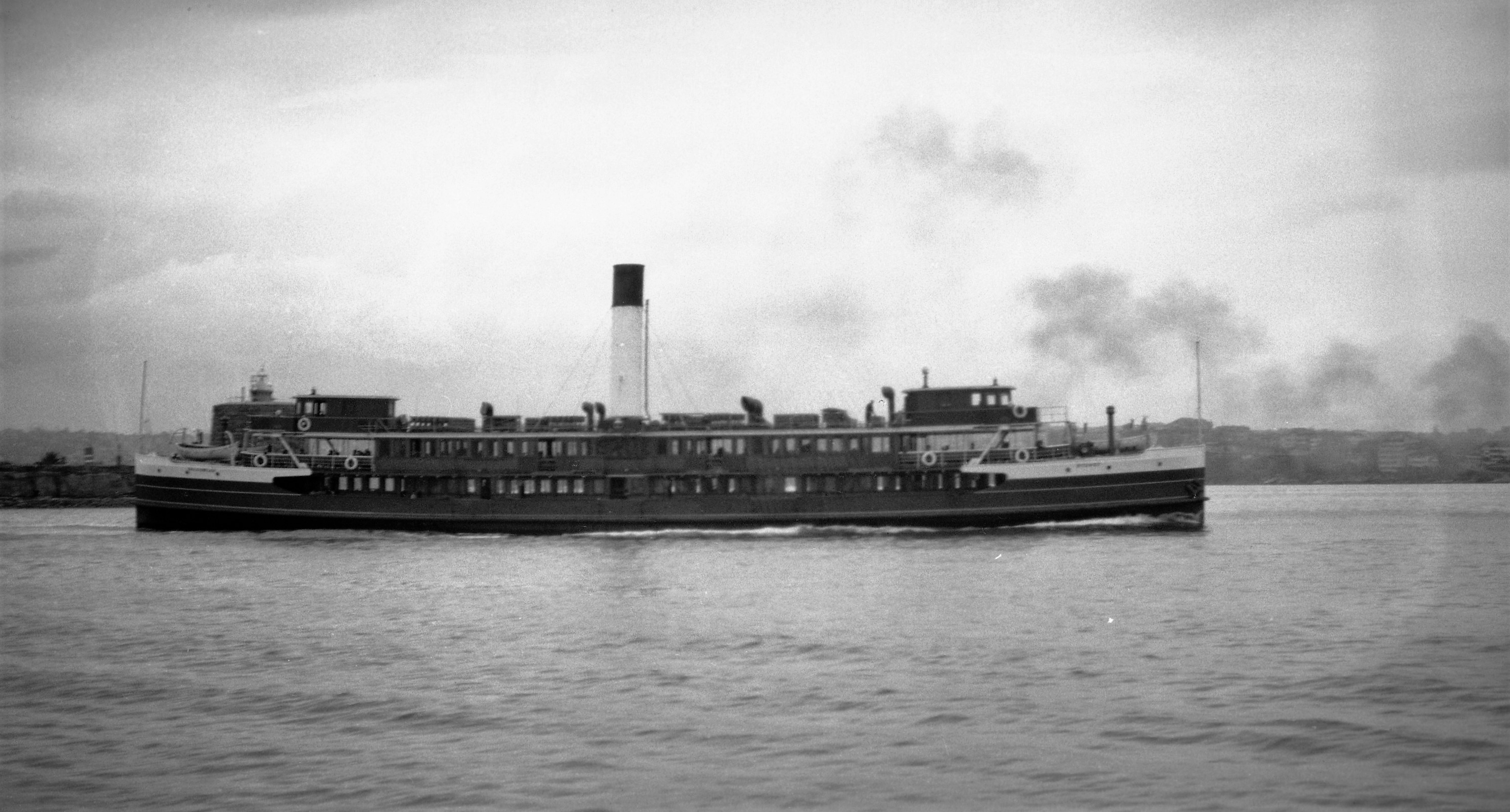
1930s or 1940s after her upper decks were enclosed.

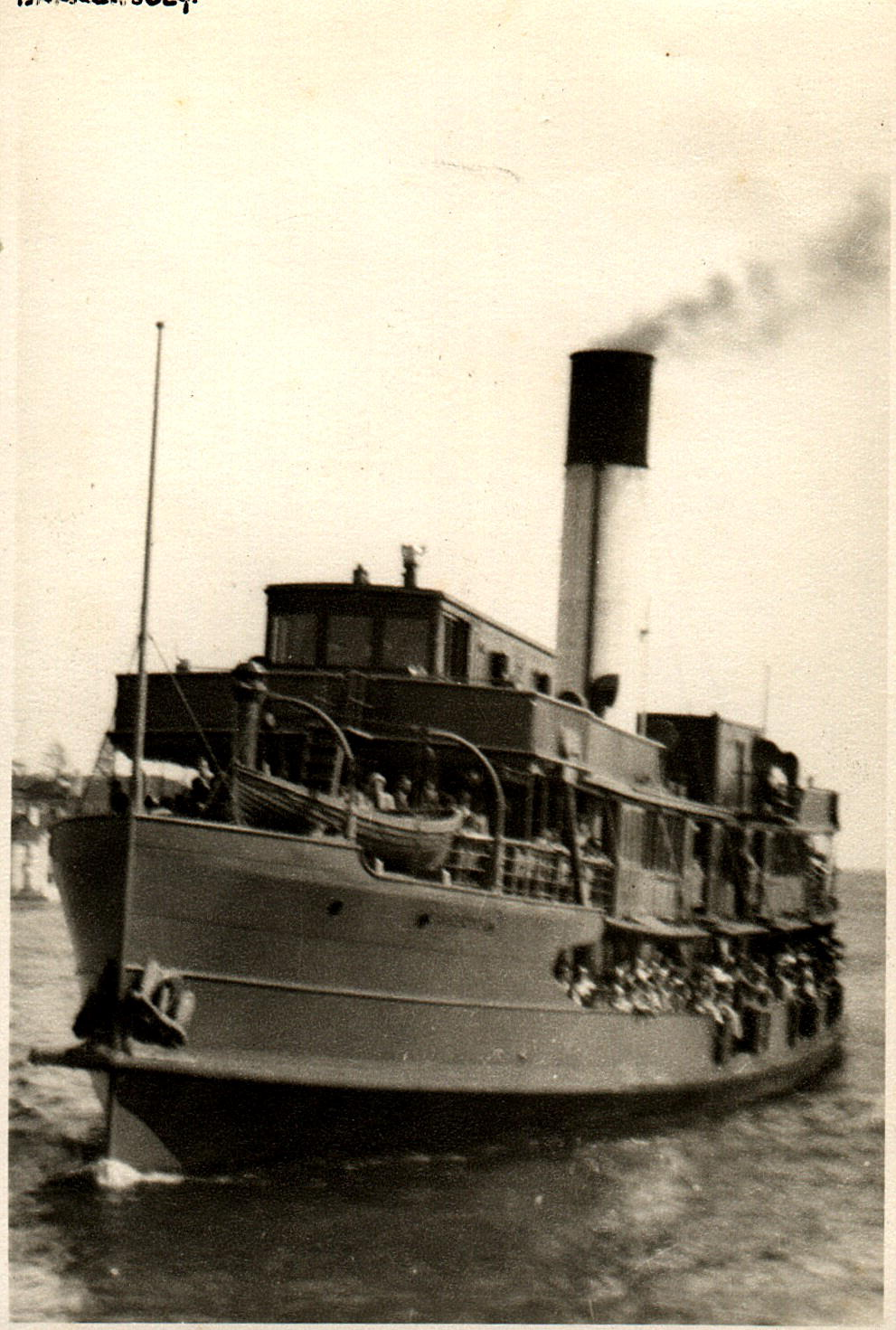
In World War II wartime grey, 1940s

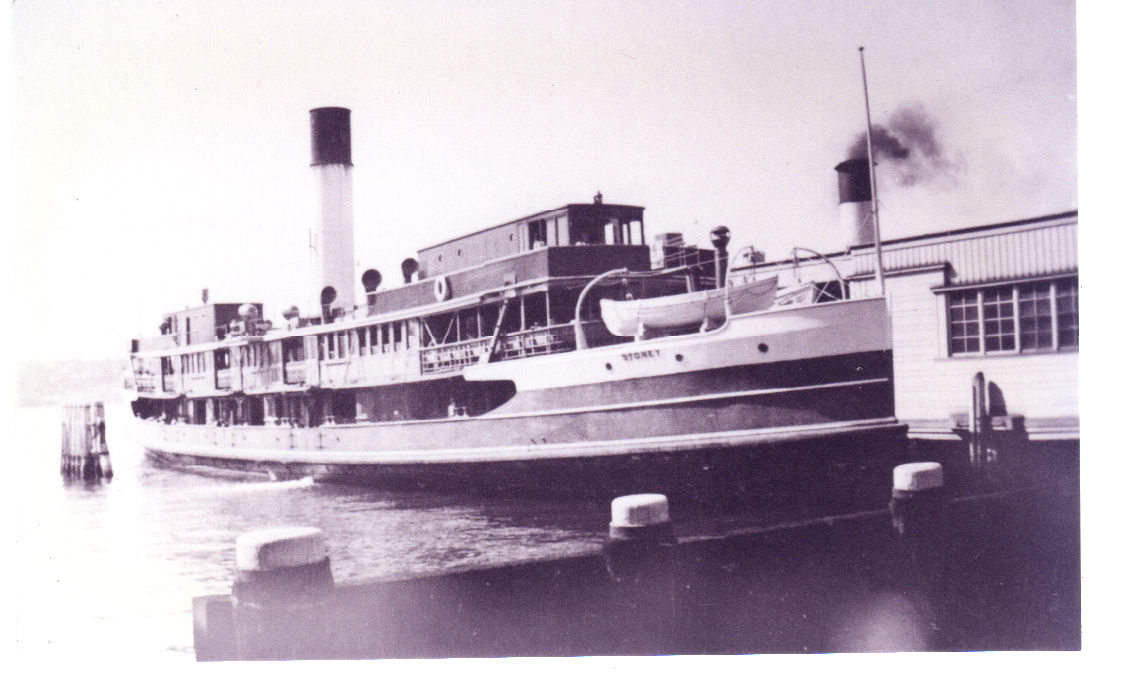
Balgowlah circa 1950 in her final configuration showing enclosed upper decks and fully extended wheelhouses.

== Demise ==
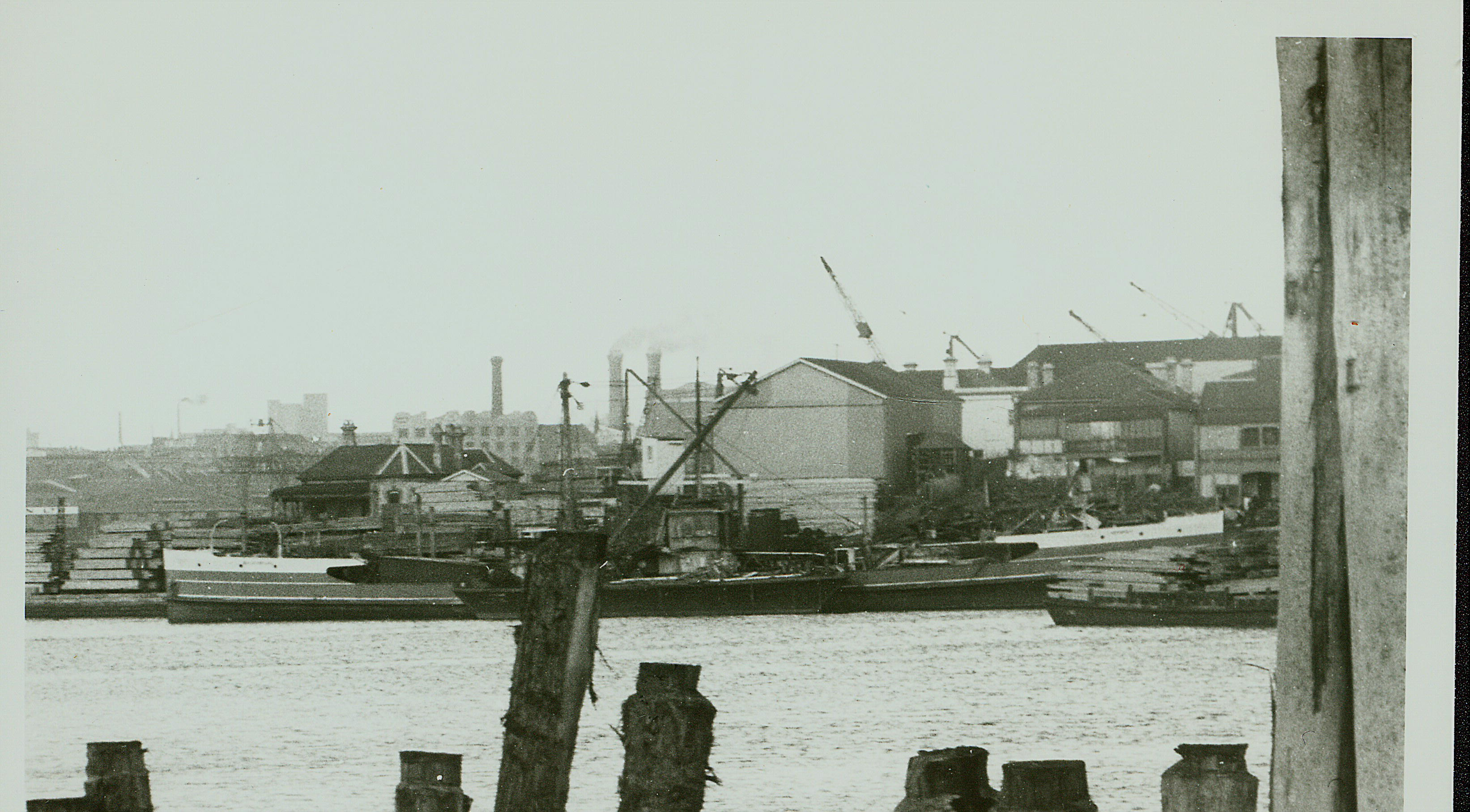
Being broken up in Strides yard, Rozelle Bay, 1954

After being laid up since 1951, it was sold to Sylvester Stride, Leichhardt in 1953 for breaking up. The hull was cut down and converted to a lighter, and used in the demolition of the old Iron Cove Bridge after which it was allegedly scuttled nearby.

== See also ==
- List of Sydney Harbour ferries
- Timeline of Sydney Harbour ferries
