= HMAS Burra Bra =

Many ferry requisitioned by Royal Australian Navy

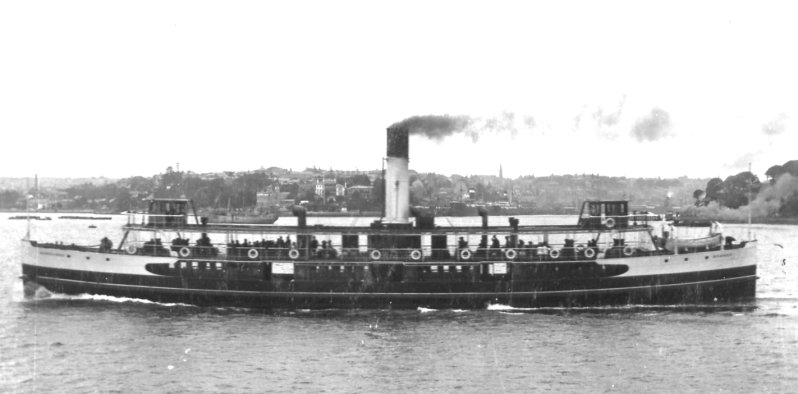
- Burra Bra as built, ca. 1909

History

Australia
- Name: Burra Bra
- Operator: Port Jackson & Manly Steamship Company
- Port of registry: Sydney
- Route: Manly
- Builder: Mort's Dock
- Yard number: 33
- Launched: 17 June 1908
- Out of service: 1940

Australia (RAN)
- Name: Burra Bra
- Acquired: 14 November 1942
- Commissioned: 1 February 1943
- Fate: Sold in 1947 and scrapped

General characteristics
- Tonnage: 458 gross tonnage
- Length: 195 ft (59 m)
- Beam: 31.6 ft (10 m)
- Depth: 14.3 ft (4 m)
- Decks: 2
- Capacity: 1,448
- Armament: 1 × 12-pounder gun; 2 × .303-inch Vickers machine guns

Burra Bra was a Manly ferry on Sydney Harbour that operated by the Port Jackson & Manly Steamship Company from 1908 until 1940, before being requisitioned by the Royal Australian Navy for use as an anti-submarine training vessel and target tow during World War II.

"Burra-Bra" is an Australian Aboriginal name for The Spit in northern Sydney.

== Background ==
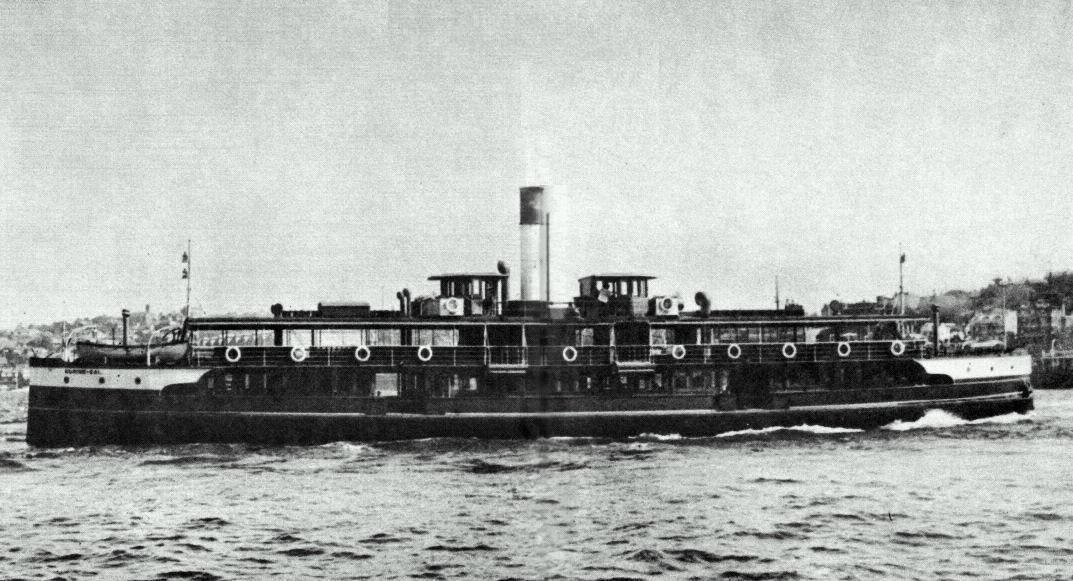
Kuring-gai (1901) was the forerunner to the "Bingarra-type" vessels including Burra-Bra. Note the wheel houses located midships compared to Burra-Bra's at the ends of the sun deck.

The Port Jackson & Manly Steamship Company's fleet transitioned comparatively late to screw propelled vessels and the fleet comprised mostly paddle steamers until the early years of the twentieth century. The difficulty of turning in the narrow bays of Sydney Harbour - particularly in the busy Circular Quay terminus in Sydney Cove - required the use of double-ended vessels. However, a double-ended screw configuration was particularly difficult for the fine bows that Manly ferries required for both speed and heavy seas. Further, a propeller at the leading forward end of a vessel reduced speed considerably. In the prosperous early twentieth century, this speed drawback was overcome by increasing engine size and power.

The first screw ferries on the Manly run were two innovative Walter Reeks–designed vessels; the SS Manly (1896), and SS Kuring-gai (1901), which were to become the fore-runners of the "Binngarra-class" ferries. They both had high forecastles at either to help her run through the deep-sea conditions across the Sydney Heads. The steel-hulled Kuring-gai was larger and she further refined the basic design to be similar to the subsequent and larger "Binngarra-class" vessels. Manly and Kuring-gai had both, however, followed paddle steamer design with their bridges around the midships funnels. Whereas the "Binngarra-class" vessels would have their wheelhouses at either end of their promenade decks.

== Design and construction ==
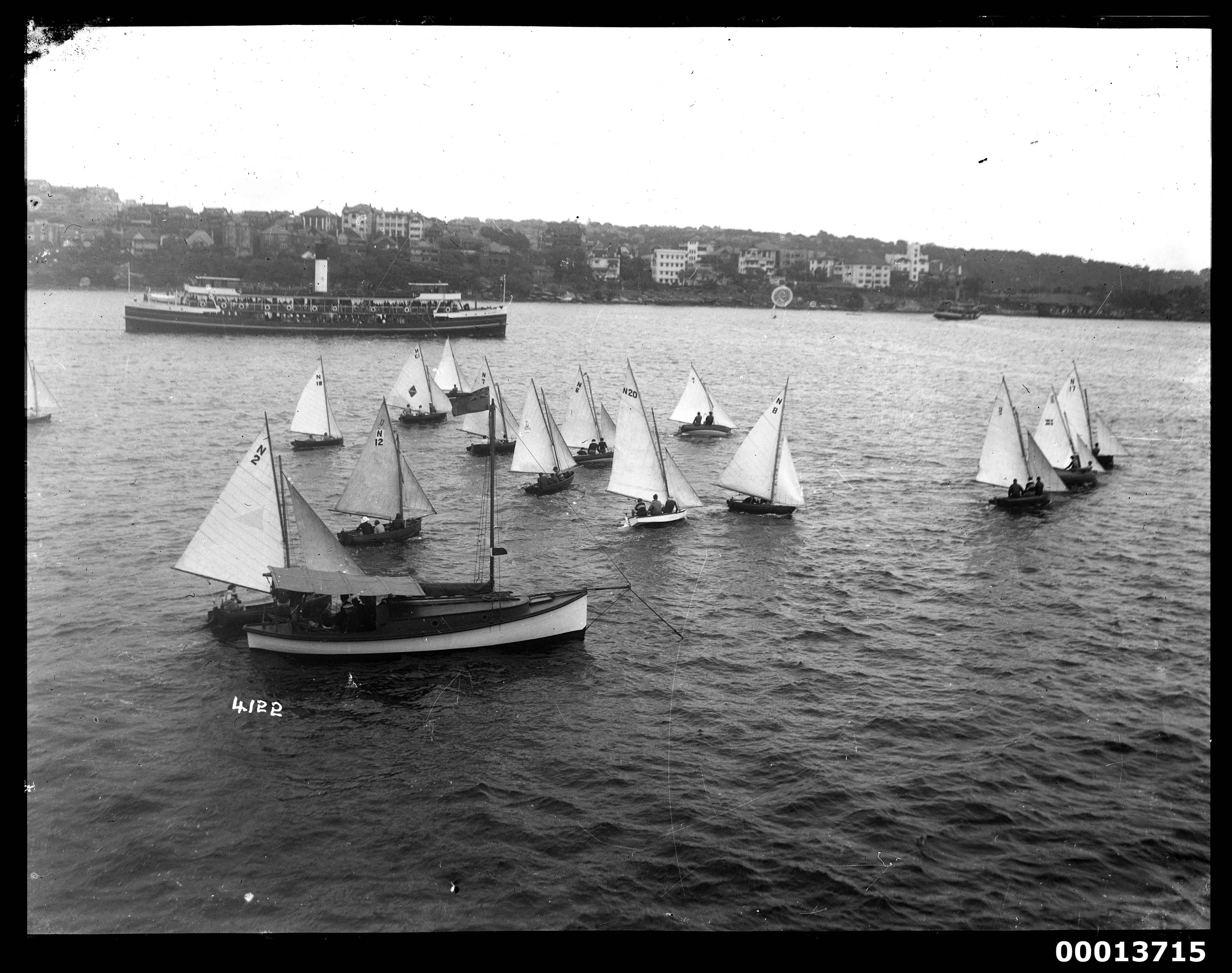
The ferry, Burra Bra, (background) on Sydney Harbour with racing skiffs, c. 1920

Burra Bra was built by Mort Docks and Engineering Co, Woolwich for the Port Jackson & Manly Steamship Company for the Manly service. Launched on 17 June 1908, it was the second of six Binngarra type Manly ferries. Almost identical sister ship to Binngarra (1905), Bellubera (1910), Balgowlah (1912), Barrenjoey (1913 - later North Head, and Baragoola.

At 59 metres in length and with a gross tonnage of 458 tons, she had a passenger capacity of 1,448. With her open upper deck, her winter capacity was 916 passengers. Her triple-expansion steam engines generated 100 hp and powered her to a maximum of 13 knots.

== Ferry service ==
She made her trial run on 6 November 1908.

During the 1928 Roman Catholic Congress, the church used the vessel to ferry delegates to Manly. She was painted white with a large cross on either side of her funnel and was escorted many smaller craft and other ferries. She was the flagship for the Pittwater Regatta on 28 December 1929.

She became the last of the open upper deck Manly ferries; unlike her sisters, Bellubera, Barrenjoey (North Head), and Baragoola her upper decks were never enclosed. The second oldest of the Binngarra type ferry (Binngarra of 1905 was hulked in 1933), she was used as a spare ferry from the mid-1930s. The ferry was withdrawn from service in 1940.

== Naval service ==
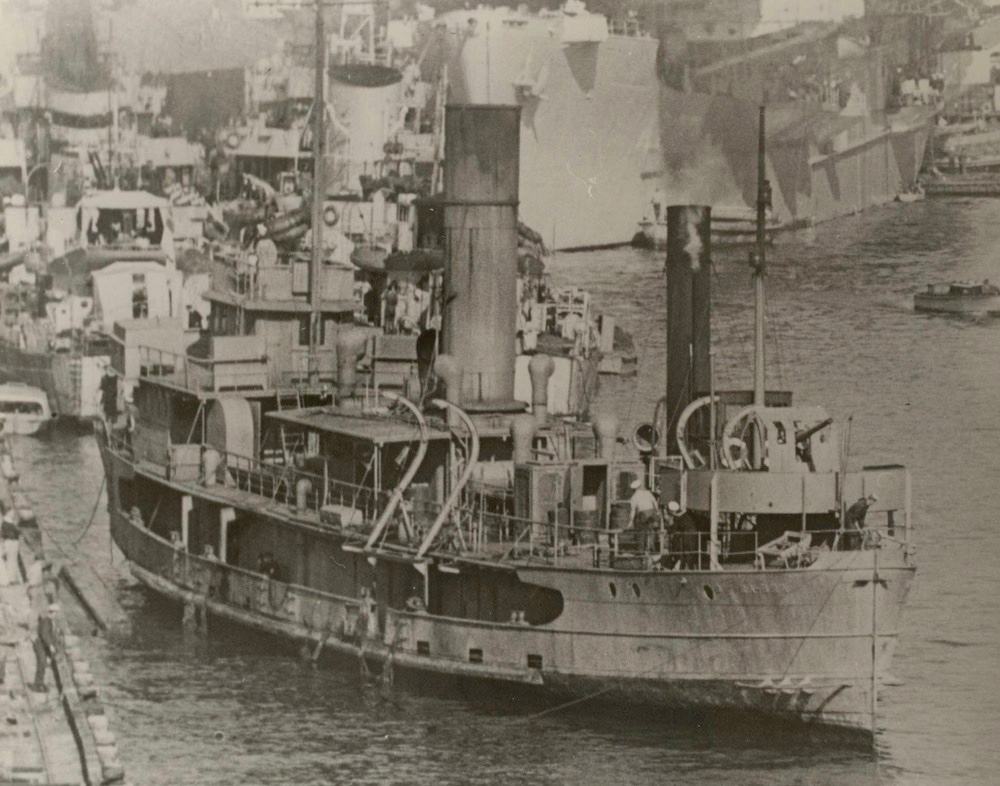
At Woolloomooloo as an anti-submarine training ship for RAN during WW2

On 13 November 1942 during World War II, it was requisitioned by the Royal Australian Navy. Her superstructure was stripped down, one wheelhouse removed, and she was fitted out by Poole and Steel Limited (Sydney) and armed with one 12-pounder on the stern, two Vickers machine guns, and two depth charge chutes. She was commissioned HMAS Burra Bra, with the Pennant Number 69, on 1 February 1943. Based at Jervis Bay, the navy used her at sea as an anti-submarine training ship and as a target towing vessel for aircraft torpedo and bombing practise. On 25 August 1943 Burra Bra was purchased by the Commonwealth government. It was laid up on 1 June 1944 at Athol Bight adjacent Bradleys Head, before being used to supply steam to vessels under refit. It was sold in November 1947 for stripping and later scuttled at sea.

== Chronology ==
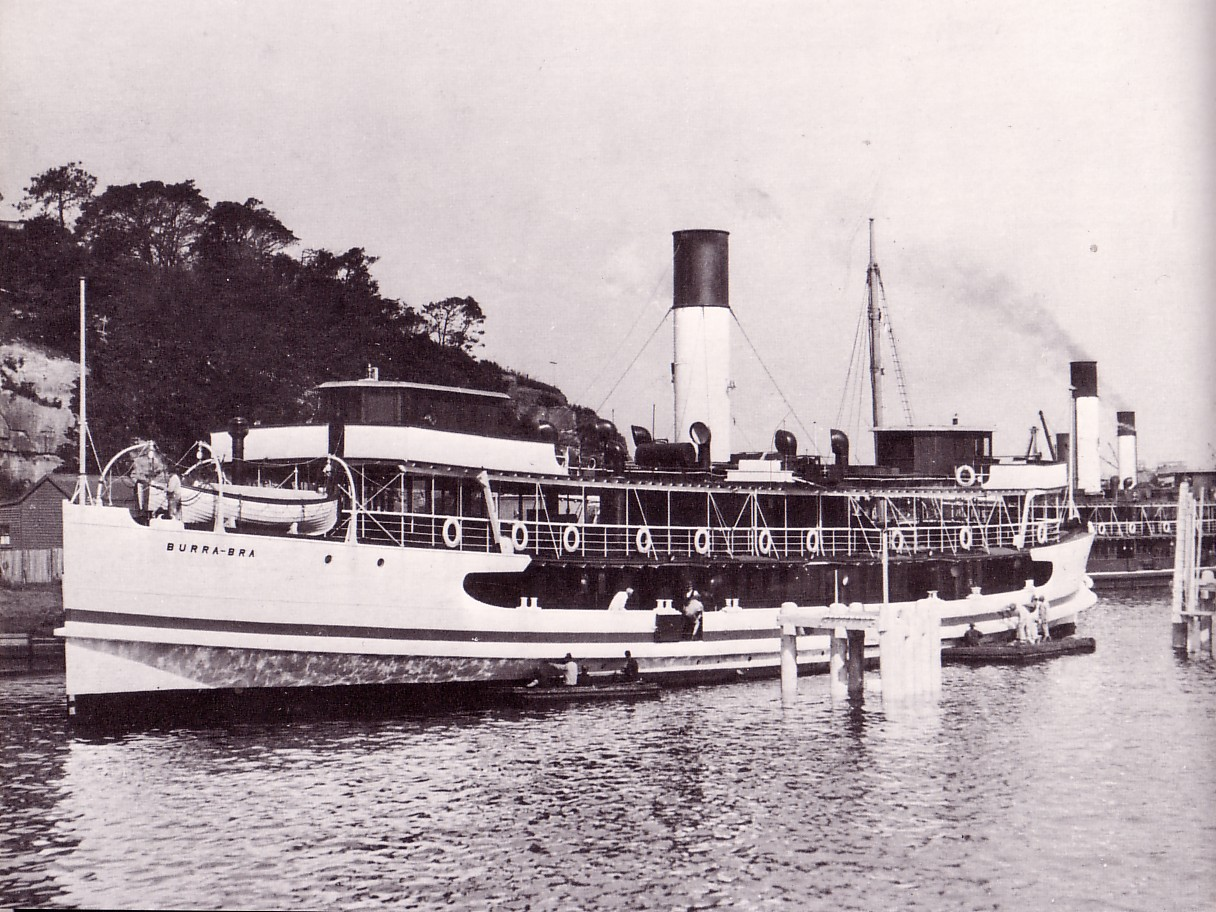
Painted white for the 1928 Roman Catholic Congress to carry delegates to Manly.

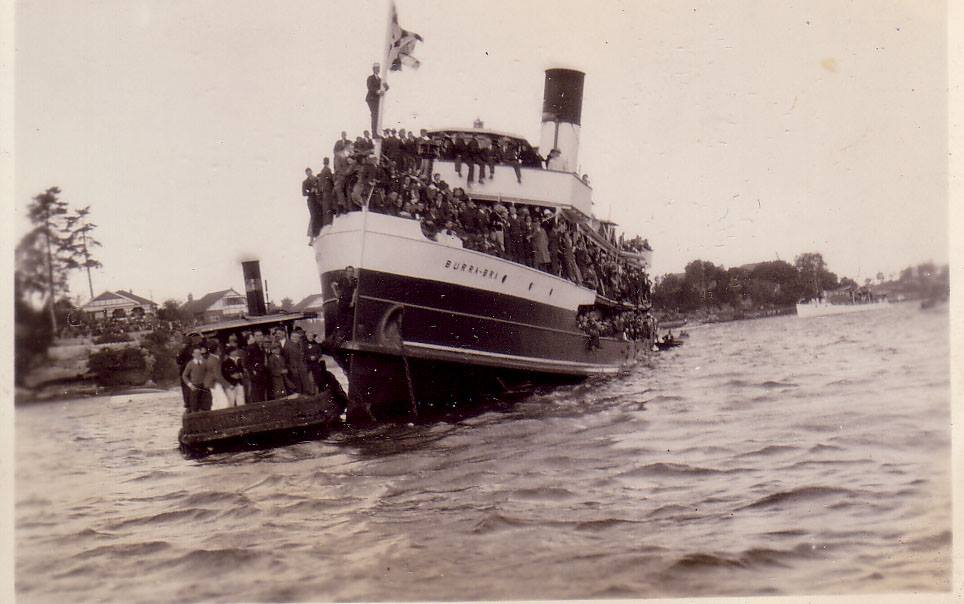
With a capacity spectator crowd, 1920s or early 1930s

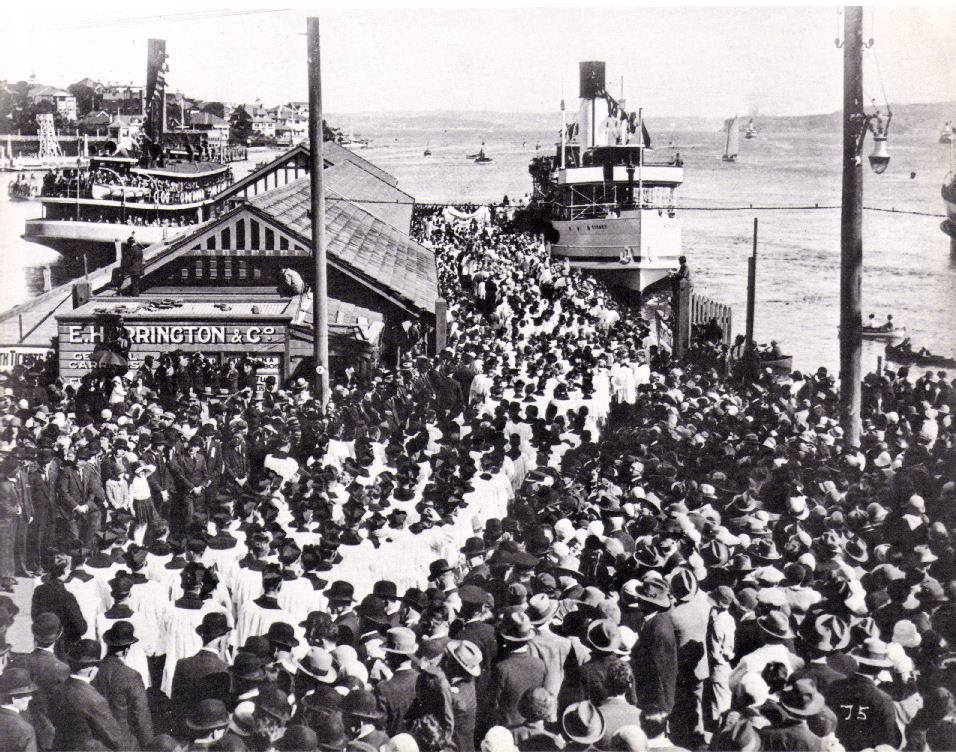
With Koompartoo (left) during the 1928 Roman Catholic Conference

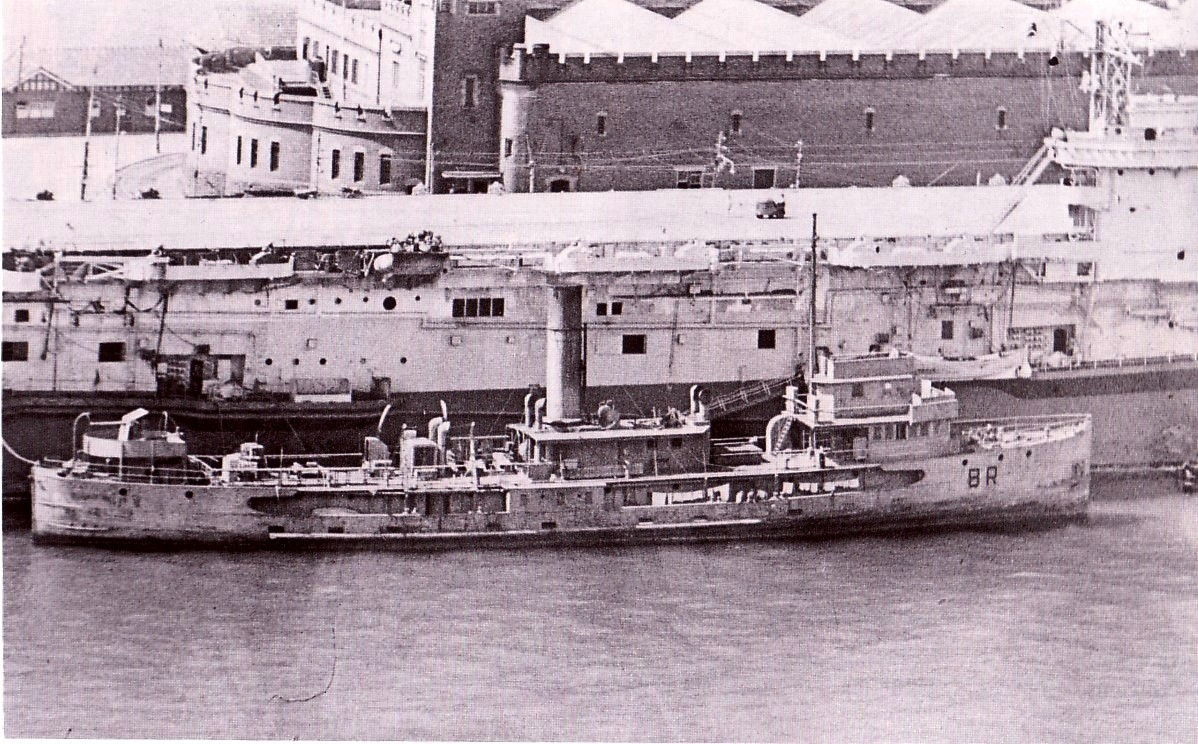
At Bennelong Point as an RAN anti-submarine vessel

== See also ==
- List of Sydney Harbour ferries
- Timeline of Sydney Harbour ferries
