= Binngarra =

Former Manly ferry in Sydney, Australia

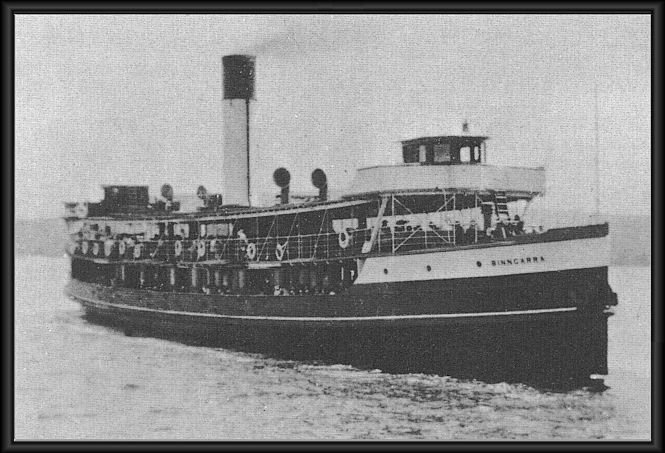
- Binngarra on Sydney Harbour

History
- Name: Binngarra
- Operator: Port Jackson & Manly Steamship Company
- Port of registry: Sydney
- Route: Manly
- Builder: Mort's Dock and Engineering
- Cost: £23,564
- Launched: 18 July 1905
- Maiden voyage: 29 October 1905
- Out of service: 1930
- Fate: Scuttled 11 December 1946

General characteristics
- Class & type: Binngarra-class ferry
- Tonnage: 442 tons
- Length: 58.1 m (190 ft 7 in)
- Beam: 9.7 m (31 ft 10 in)
- Height: 4.1 m (13 ft 5 in)
- Draught: 3.45 m (11 ft 4 in)
- Decks: 2
- Installed power: 103 NHP, 1,150 ihp (860 kW)
- Propulsion: 3 cylinder tripled expansion steam engines
- Speed: 13 knots (24 km/h; 15 mph)
- Capacity: 1,372 passengers (fair weather), 858 (rough weather)
- Crew: 11

Binngarra was a ferry operated by Port Jackson & Manly Steamship Company on the Manly service. Launched in 1905, she was the first of six similar vessels built for the company–the Binngarra class—the success of which saw three of her sister vessels serving through to the 1970s and 1980s.

Built by Mort's Dock and Engineering Co Ltd, in Woolwich, she was a double-ended screw steamer with steel hull and timber superstructure. She was decommissioned from ferry service in 1930.

"Binngarra" is thought to be an Australian Aboriginal word for "spring" or "returning". It is sometimes misspelled as "Bingarra".

== Background ==
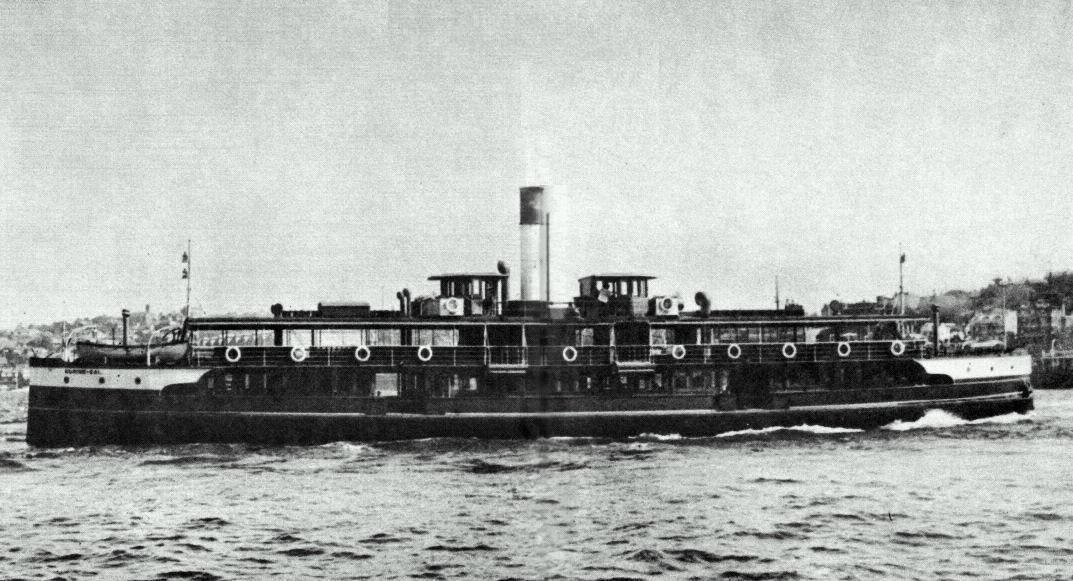
Kuring-gai (1901) was the forerunner to the "Binngarra-type" vessels. Note the wheel houses located midships compared to Binngarra's at the ends of the sun deck.

The Port Jackson & Manly Steamship Company's fleet transitioned comparatively late to screw propelled vessels and the fleet comprised mostly paddle steamers until the early years of the twentieth century. The difficulty of turning in the narrow bays of Sydney Harbour - particularly in the busy Circular Quay terminus in Sydney Cove - required the use of double-ended vessels. However, a double-ended screw configuration was particularly difficult for the fine bows that Manly ferries required for both speed and heavy seas. Further, a propeller at the leading forward end of a vessel reduced speed considerably. In the prosperous early twentieth century, this speed drawback was overcome by increasing engine size and power.

The first screw ferries on the Manly run were two innovative Walter Reeks–designed vessels; the SS Manly (1896), and SS Kuring-gai (1901), which were to become the fore-runners of the "Binngarra-class" ferries. They both had high forecastles at either to help her run through the deep-sea conditions across the Sydney Heads. The steel-hulled Kuring-gai was larger and she further refined the basic design that would be the basis of the subsequent and larger "Binngarra-class" vessels.

== Design and construction ==
While Manly and Kuring-gai followed paddle steamer design with their bridges around the midships funnels, the "Binngarra-class" vessels would have their wheelhouses at either end of their sun decks. This design, of which Binngarra was the first, would be the basic form of the Manly ferries that served for most of the 20th century up to and including the Freshwater class in the early 1980s. Subsequent to Binngarra, five similar refinements of the design were built - Burra-Bra (1908), Bellubera (1910), Balgowlah (1912), Barrenjoey (1913), and Baragoola (1922). The class were designed by Mort's Dock and Engineering, initially under the guidance of former chief draughtsman Andrew Christie. Binngarra and the next four were built at Mort's Woolwich yard while Baragoola was built at the Balmain yard. They were among the largest ships built in Australian yards at the time and, on the admission of Mort's executives, were built by the dock more for prestige than profit. Build costs were higher in Australia than in the United Kingdom, but this was offset by the cost of sailing them out to Australia.

Binngarra's triple expansion steam engines were built by Mort's Dock and Engineering, and had cylinders 17.5 inches (44 cm), 27.5 inches (70 cm), and 45 inches (110 cm) respectively in diameter, with a stroke of 27 inches (690 mm), and steam reversing gear. Steam was generated by two Navy type boilers each 10 feet 8 inches (3.25 m) in diameter and 18 feet 6 inches (5.64 m) long, with corrugated furnaces of 4 feet 4.5 inches (1.334 m) in diameter, which were tested for a working pressure of 160 pounds per square inch (1,100 kPa). A donkey boiler also fitted.

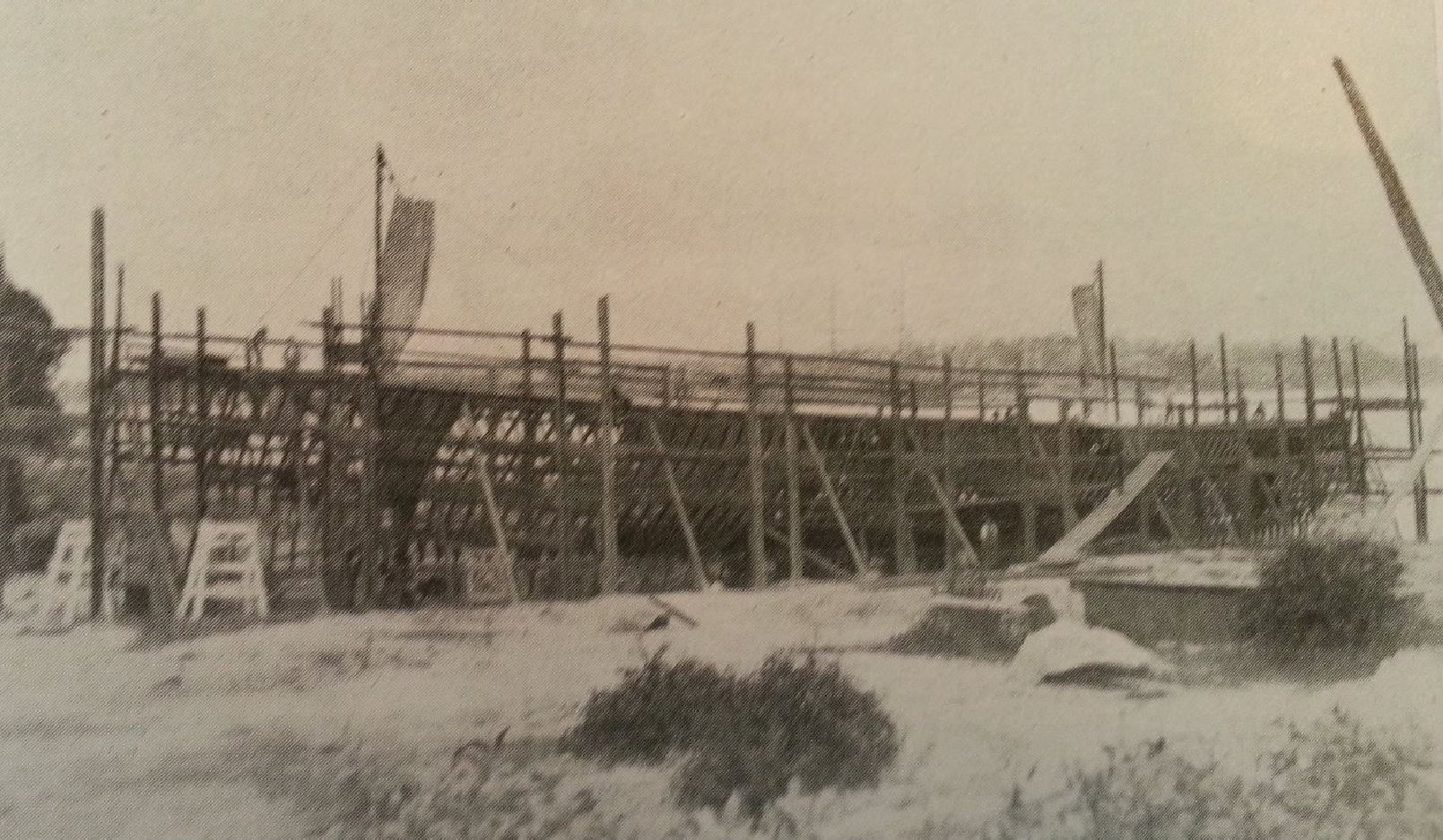
Under construction, Clarkes Point Woolwich, 1905

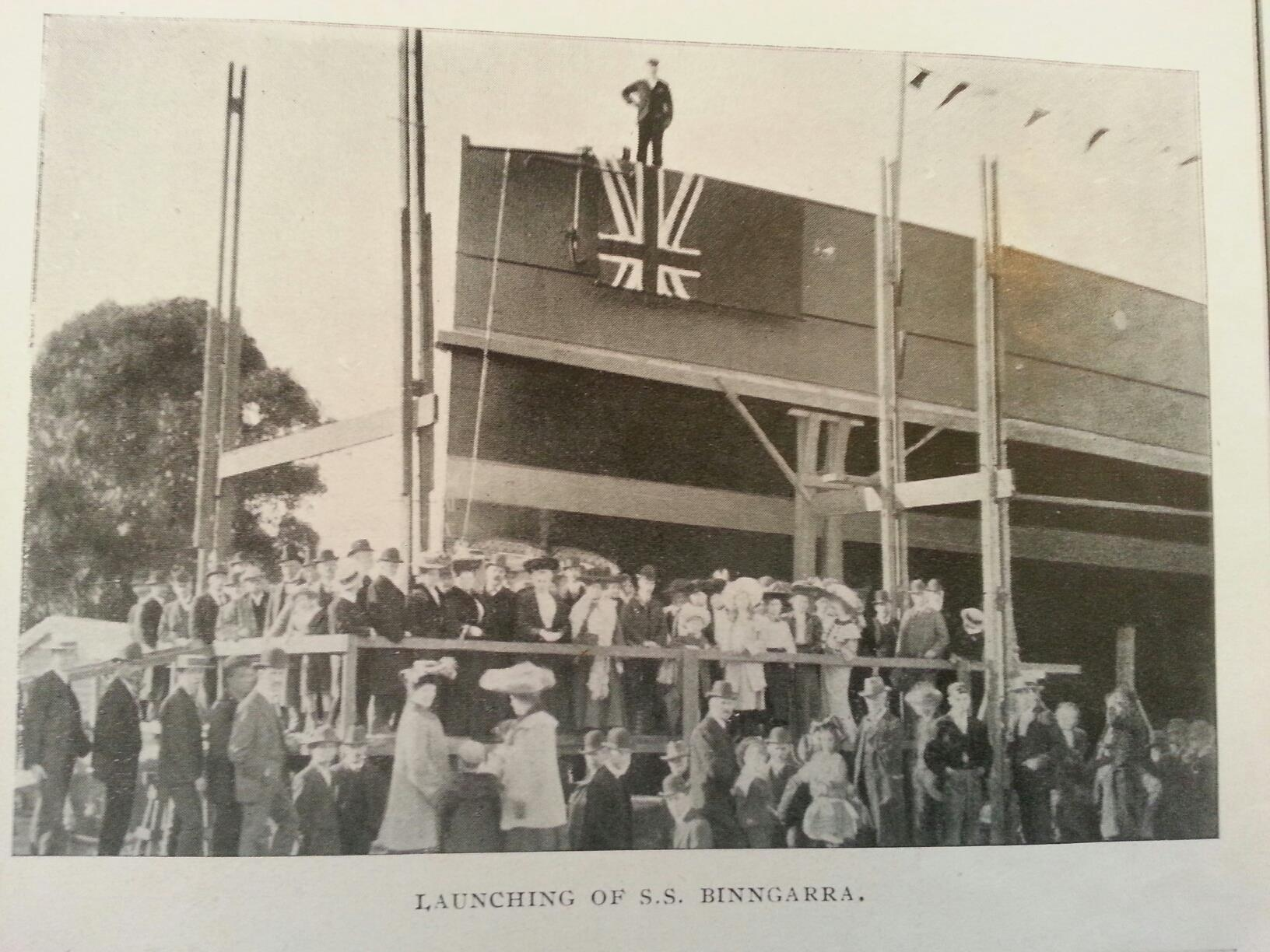
Launch day, 18 July 1905

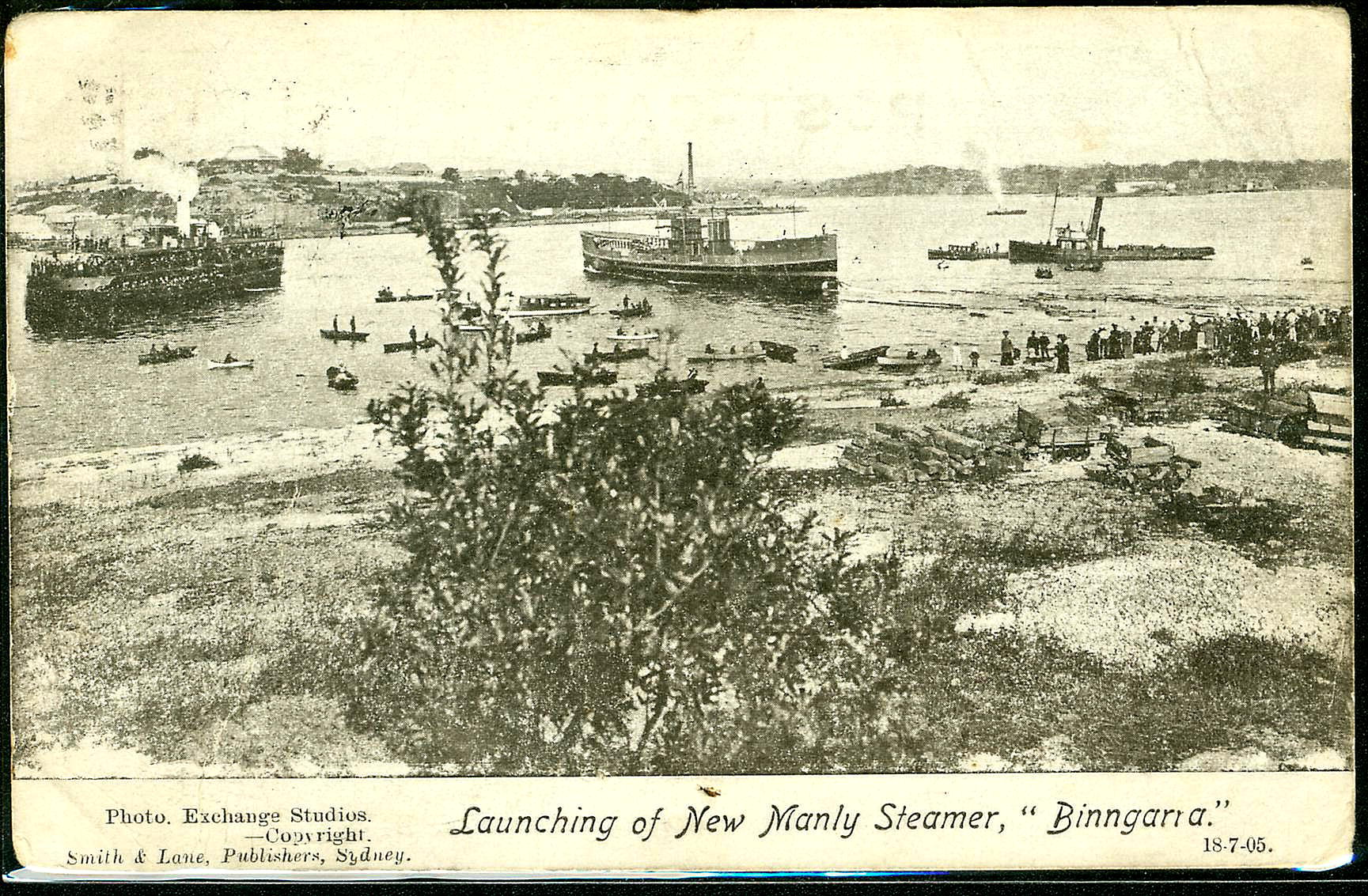
Binngarra being launched, with her forerunner, Kuring-gai, on the left, 18 July 1905

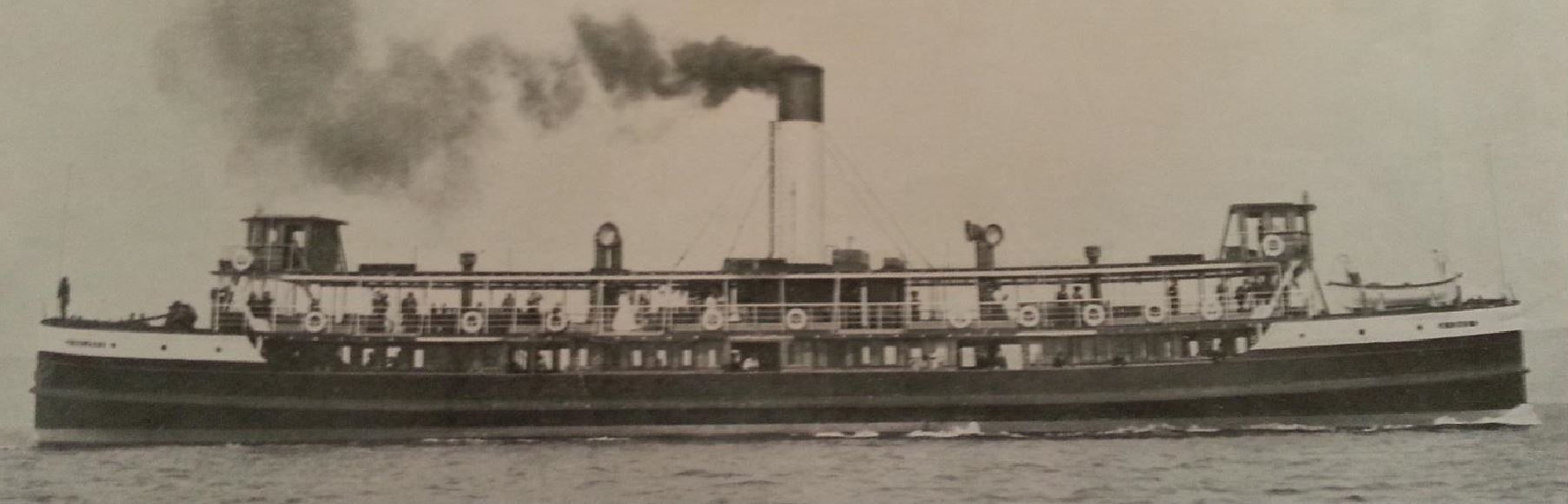
As built, circa 1905, without dodgers around her wheelhouses

== Service history ==
Binngarra had her official trials on 26 October 1905 where she reached 14 knots (26 km/h; 16 mph) and she entered service three days later on the 3 pm run from Circular Quay to Manly. Two days after she collided with the sea wall at the Quay.

In 1926, she collided with the wooden K-class ferry, Kanimbla. Damage to the larger steel Binngarra was minimal, however, Kanimbla was severely damaged and according to some reports, was lucky not to sink.

It is estimated that over her 24 years of ferry service, Binngarra completed close to 100,000 round trips to Manly and carried 30 million passengers. She and Kuring-gai were removed from service in 1930 and 1928 respectively, following the 1928 introduction of the larger and faster Dee Why and Curl Curl. Binngarra was sold and hulked in 1933 and used in Port Stephens. Following her use in New Guinea as a cargo hulk for United States Navy during World War II, she was scuttled off Sydney on 11 December 1946.

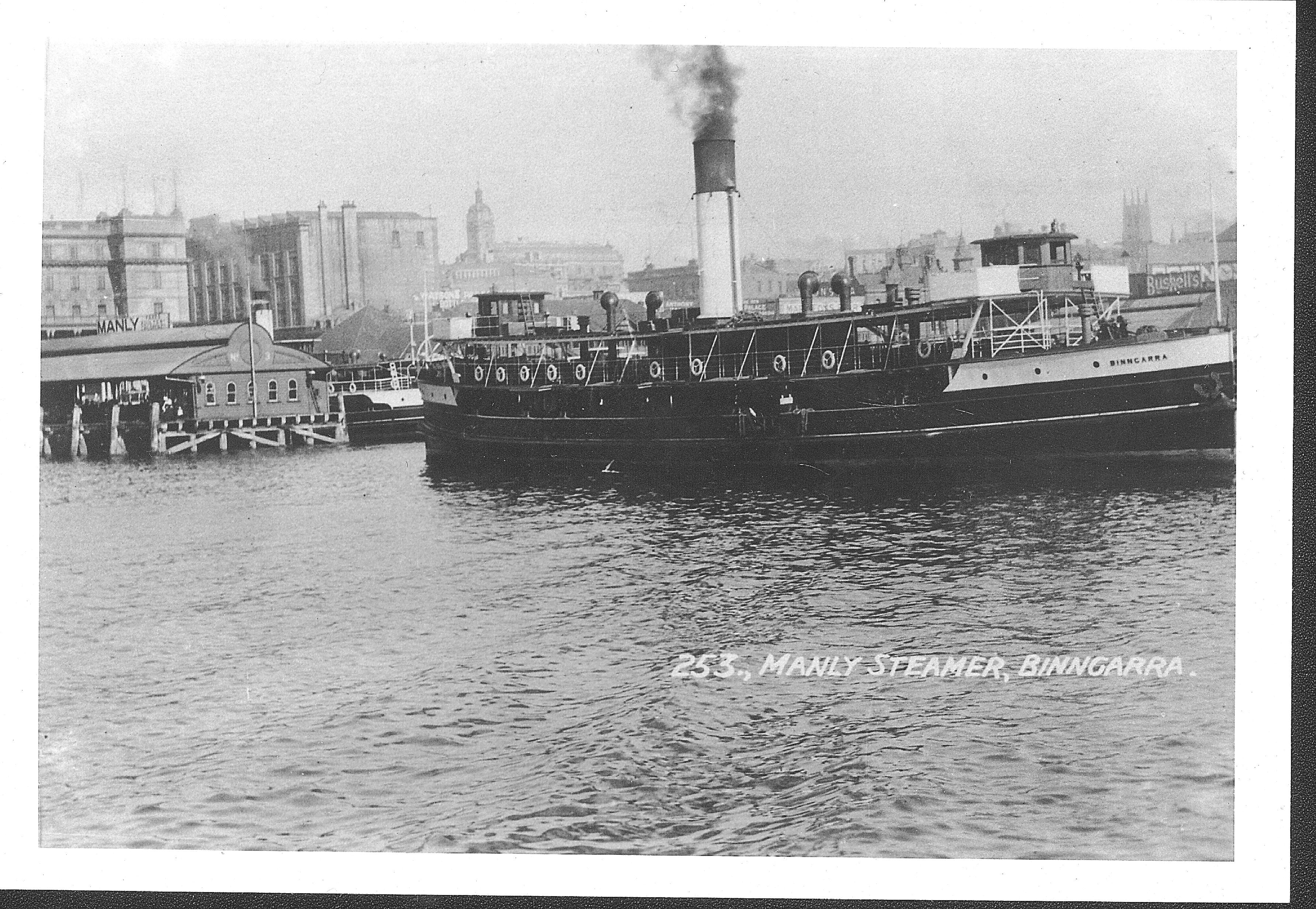
Approaching Circular Quay, 1920s

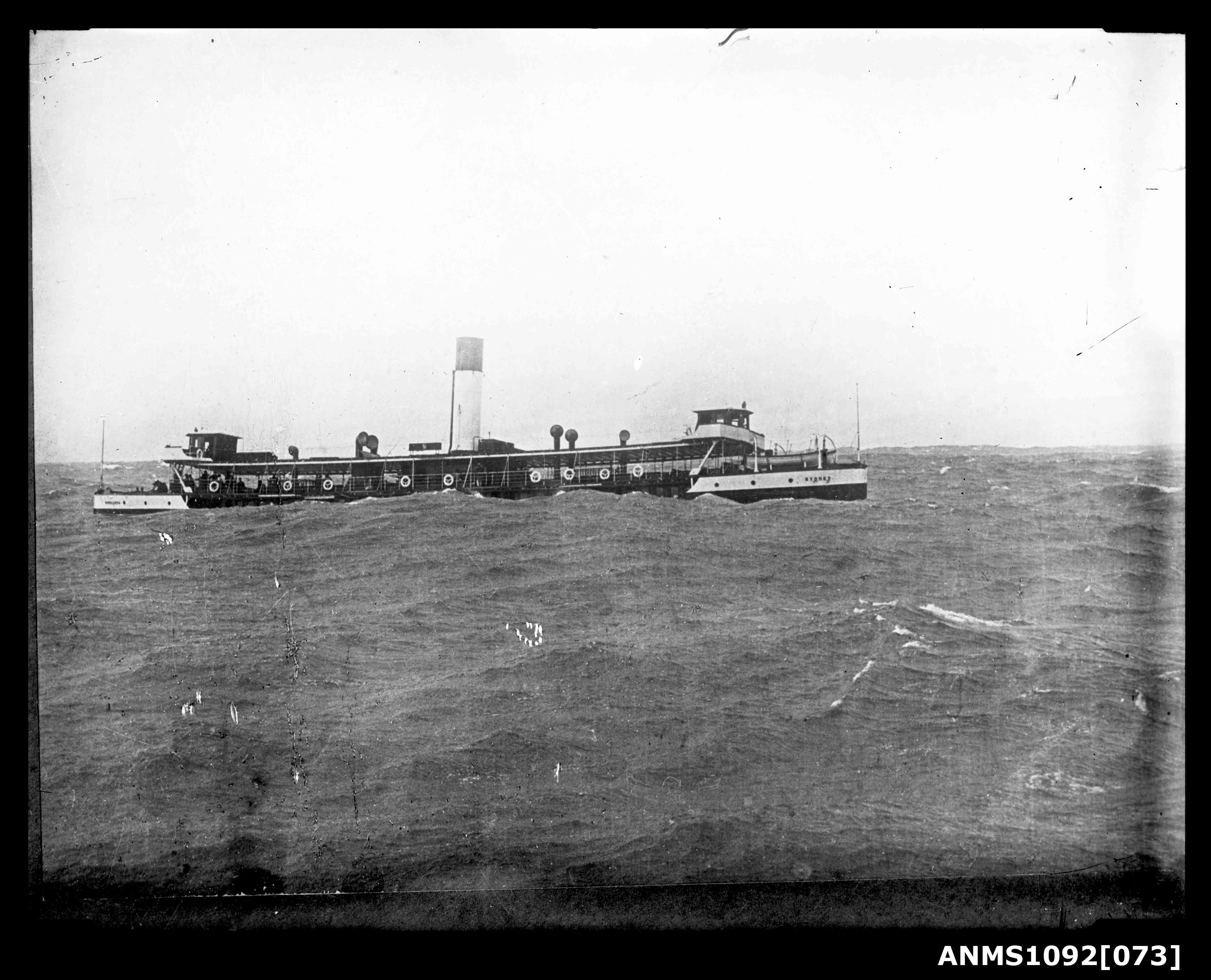
Binngarra crosses the Sydney Heads in a heavy swell

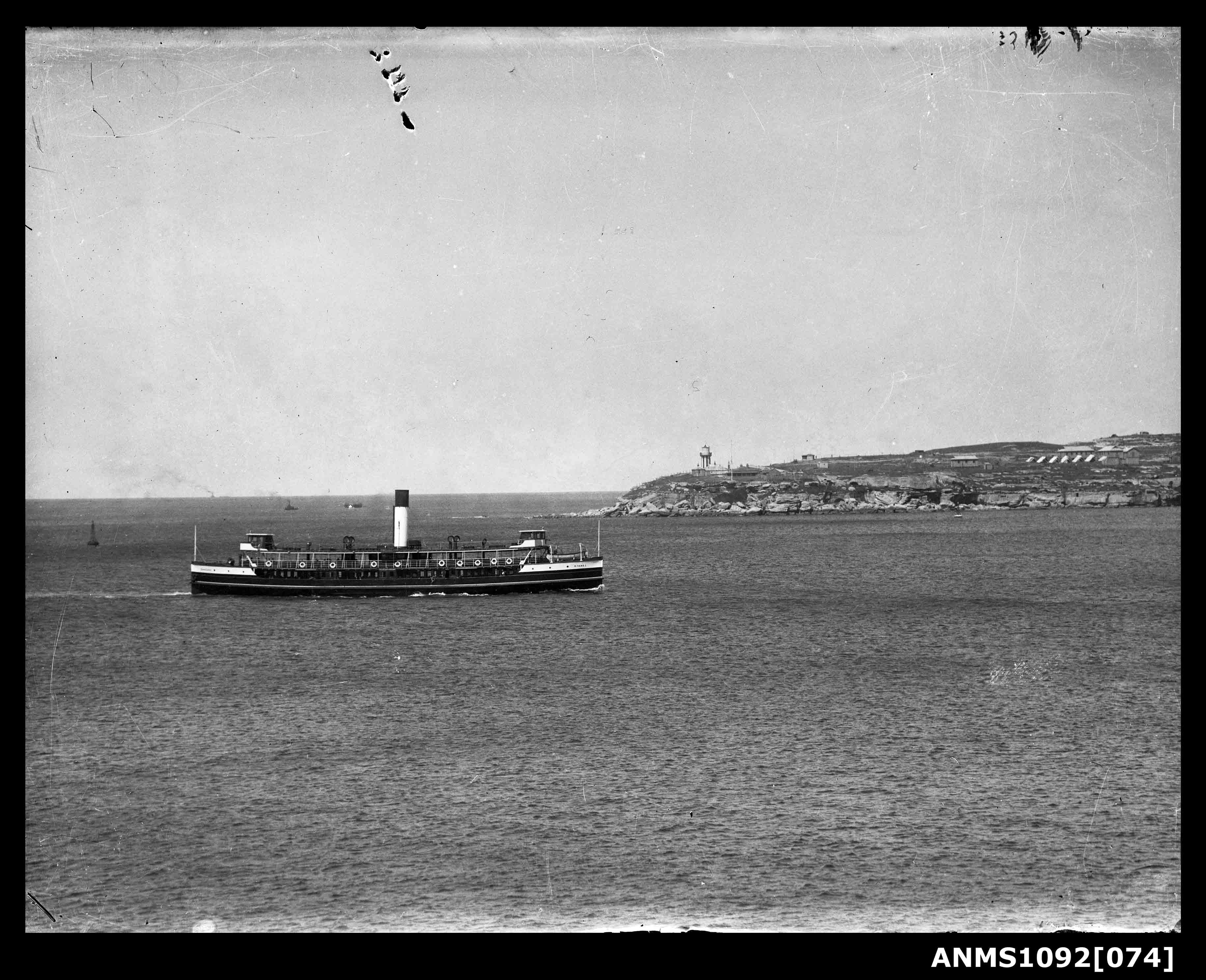
Binngarra crossing the Sydney Heads on her way from Manly to Circular Quay

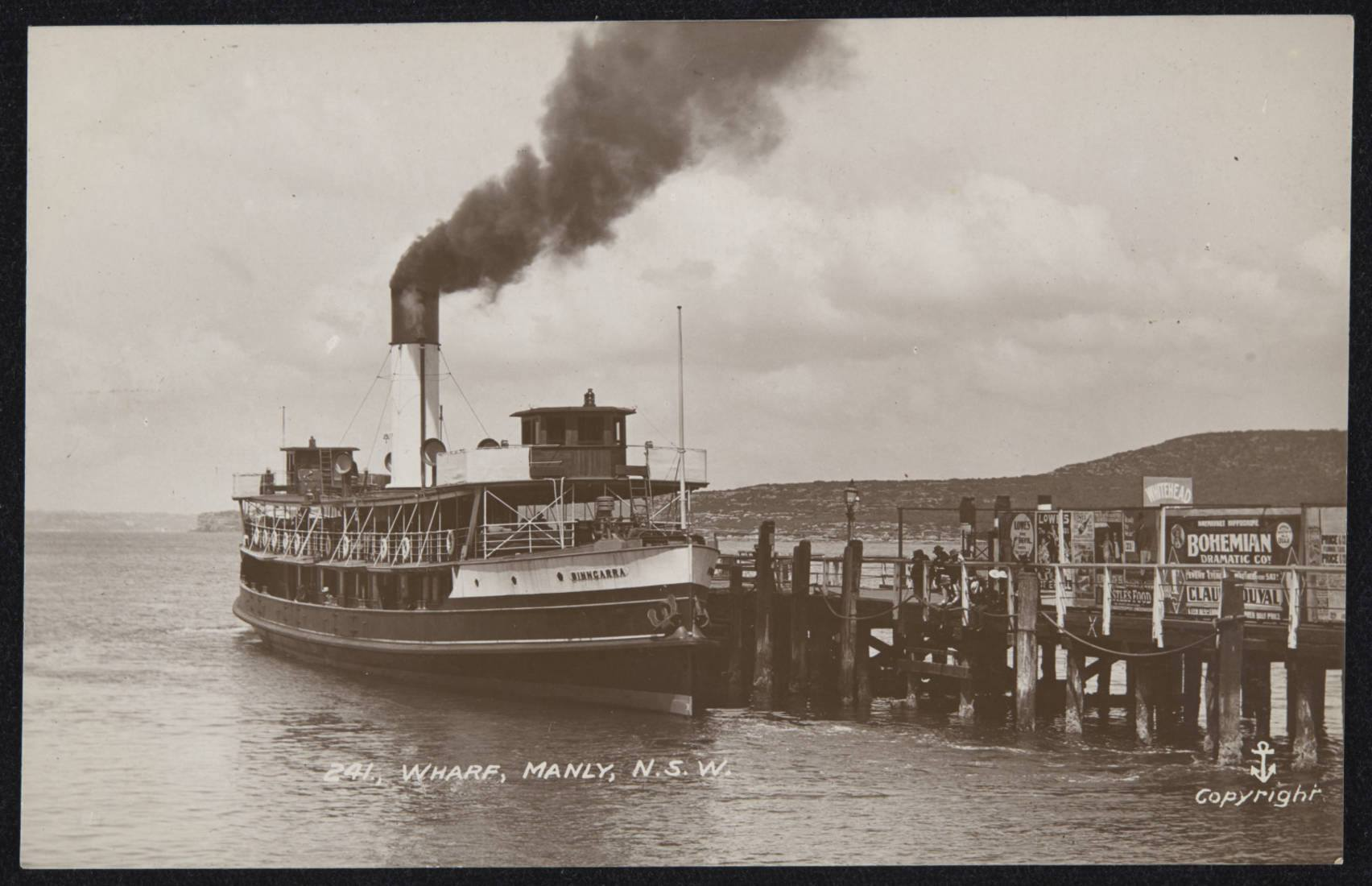
At Manly Wharf

== See also ==
- List of Sydney Harbour ferries
- Timeline of Sydney Harbour ferries
