= Port Jackson and Manly Steamship Company =

Ferry company of Australia

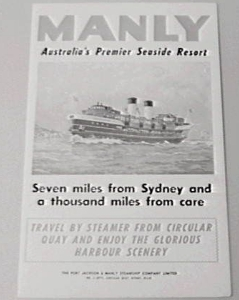
An advertisement for the Port Jackson and Manly Steamship Company circa 1940

The Port Jackson and Manly Steamship Company (PJ&MSC) was a publicly listed company that operated the Manly ferries in Sydney, Australia. After being taken over by Brambles Industries, the ferry service was eventually taken over by the State Government and is now part of Sydney Ferries.

The company is notable for coining the expression about Manly being "Seven miles from Sydney and a thousand miles from care" and for promoting development in the Manly and Pittwater / Broken Bay areas.

== Formation ==
The history of the PJ&MSC is entwined with the history of Manly itself. Manly had been envisaged as a seaside resort by Henry Gilbert Smith in the 1850s. Initially Smith had chartered a paddle steamer to Manly and other vessels visited on an ad hoc "excursion" basis. Smith built a wharf in 1855 and eventually acquired an interest in steamers himself and soon more regular services to Manly had commenced.

By 1873 Smith had sold the lease to the wharf and his share of the steamers to the operators of the ferries. The business was later acquired by John Randal Carey (who later founded the Sydney Daily Telegraph newspaper) in 1875 and together with three other businessmen formed the Port Jackson Steamship Company Limited on 23 January 1877.

By 1901 the PJ&MSC's shares were trading on the Sydney Stock Exchange.

After some disquiet about the level of fees being charged by the company (and having been encouraged by Manly Council which had advertised for an alternative provider) a group of Manly residents established a competitor company, the Manly Co-operative Steam Ferry Company, in 1893.

A period of intense price competition ensued that saw passenger numbers increase substantially. This resulted in the Co-operative experiencing financial difficulties and in 1896 its service collapsed and was taken over by the Port Jackson Company.

In 1907 the company was re-incorporated as the Port Jackson and Manly Steamship Company Limited (reflecting the merger some years earlier and sensitivity to Manly residents).

=== Chairmen ===
- John Woods (1896–1900)
- John Randal Carey (1900–1902)
- S. C. Sadler (1903–1904)
- Archibald Howie (1904–1908)
- J. J. Eyre (1908–1913)
- Hunter McPherson (1913–1932)
- Sir Archibald Howie (1932–1943)
- Handel Norman Pope (1943–1950)
- H. W. Knight (1950–1964)
- R. W. G. Hoyle (1964–1972)

== Operations: Manly ==
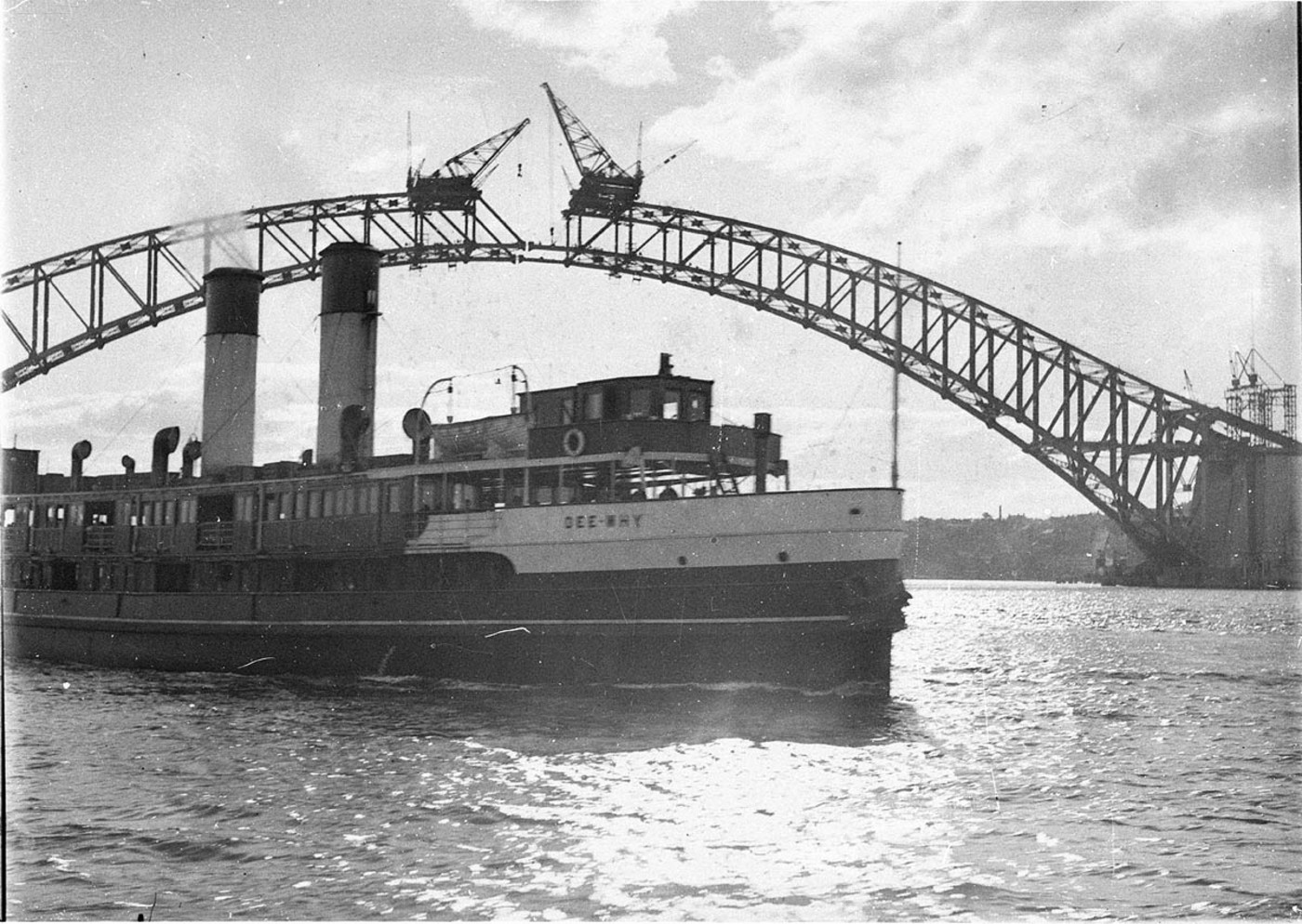
Dee Why passes the under construction Sydney Harbour Bridge

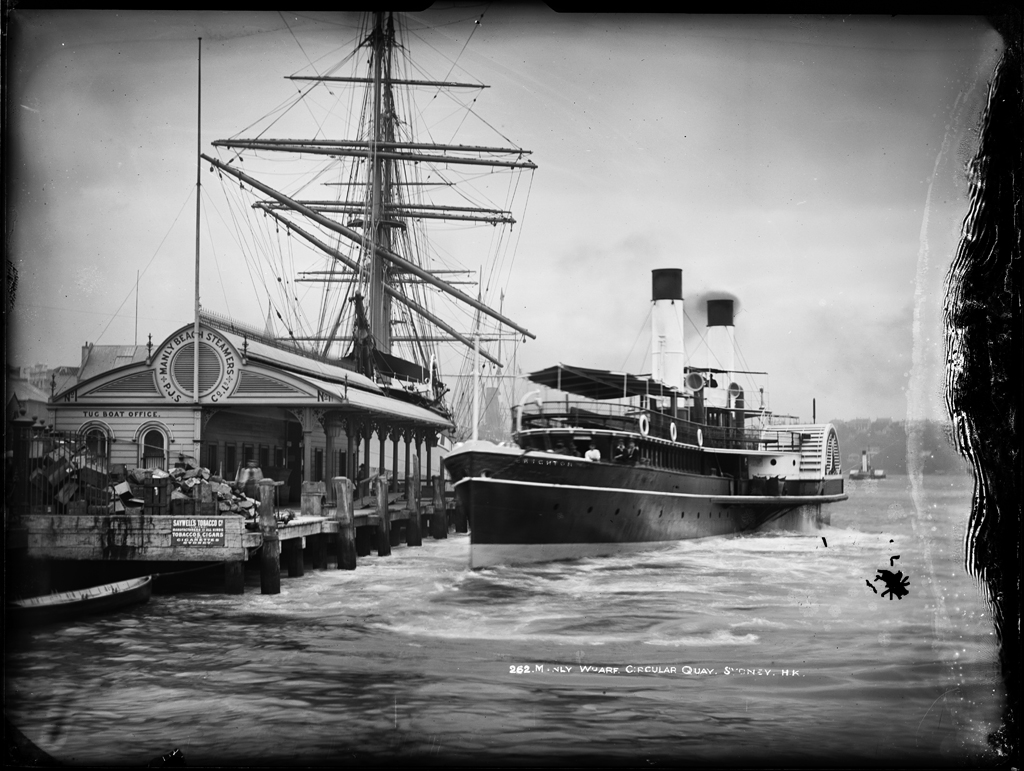
A paddle steamer approaches the wharf

For many years, ferry was the main mode of transport connecting Manly and the Sydney central business district (Circular Quay). Sydney's growing population (including growth in the 1850s due to the gold rush) saw the demand for the ferry services increase.

During its life, the PJ&MSC operated a number of types of ferries including paddle steamers, double-ended ferries with a wheelhouse at each end, coal-fired and oil-fired steamers, diesel powered ferries and hydrofoils. Some of the ferries even featured padded lounges and a wine bar. Among the many ferries were the Baragoola, Dee Why, Balgowlah and South Steyne.

Hydrofoils were introduced in 1965 to provide a high-speed service to Manly in an attempt to boost revenue. While they proved popular, their mechanical unreliability led to their demise (they were ultimately replaced by the JetCats in the early 1990s).

In addition to its ferries, the PJ&MSC built and operated other attractions to encourage patronage on its Manly run. One such feature was a large shark proof ocean swimming pool, enclosed by a boardwalk (built in 1931), extending from the wharf across to the western side of Manly Cove. Adjacent to the pool was a bathing pavilion which housed a diving and harbour plunge pool, a dance hall and dining rooms. The pool was destroyed by a large storm in 1974.

Other attractions included the conversion of an old cargo wharf into an amusement pier (Manly Fun Pier), and the HNLMS K XII, a World War II-era submarine, previously operated by the Royal Netherlands Navy, and set up adjacent to the sea pool as a museum ship.

== Relationship with Manly Council ==
During its life, the company had a complicated relationship with Manly Municipal Council. There were several disputes over various matters including the lease of the wharf, cost of fares and freight delivery.

In 1918, seven of the council's alderman who had accepted free ferry passes from the company were charged and found guilty by a magistrate of contravening the Local Government Act and disqualified to act as aldermen. As the council only had a total of nine alderman, there was a period the council did not have a quorum and therefore did not function. The convictions were overturned on appeal.

== Operations: Pittwater / Hawkesbury River ==
In 1942 the PJ&MSC acquired Palm Beach business of WJ Goddard & Sons, including general stores, marine and ferry services.

The company soon acquired some new ferries and was operating services between Church Point, the Basin, Scotland Island, Brooklyn, Berowra, Bobbin Head and Patonga.

In 1943-44 the company purchased the Currawong estate (including the guest houses) at Little Mackerel Beach and the Narrabeen Ice Works.

In 1950, with the company facing financial difficulties, the Currawong estate was sold to the Labor Council of New South Wales and some of the Pittwater ferry services were also disposed of.

== Decline and sale ==
Better roads (including the Warringah Freeway), the upgrading of the Spit Bridge in 1958 and the spread of cars generally translated into declining ferry patronage and profitability.

On 19 April 1972, the PJ&MSC was acquired by Brambles Industries. Brambles main interest in the business, was the 50% shareholding in Tidewater Port Jackson Marine, which operated six platform supply vessels. Following a threat by Brambles to reduce the Manly ferry services, the NSW Government arranged for the Public Transport Commission to take over the service as from 1 December 1974.

A few government restructures later, the former operations of the former PJ&MSC now are again privately operated by Harbour City Ferries (now Transdev Sydney Ferries) under the Sydney Ferries brand.

== Fleet ==
Name	Period of service	Fate
Fairlight	1878-1912	Sold to Brisbane for use as a lighter
Brightside	1877-1908	Scrapped 1908
Brighton	1883-1916	Sold as store ship, Port Stephens
Narrabeen	1886-1917	Hulked 1917
Manly (II)	1896-1924	
Kuring-gai	1901-1928	Papua New Guinea store ship World War II, rusted remains near Hexham
Barrenjoey (rebuilt as North Head 1951)	1913-1985	Currently ashore in Cairns, Queensland
Baragoola	1922-1983	sank, 2022.
Burra Bra	1908-1943	Requisitioned by the Royal Australian Navy as an anti-submarine training vessel and target tow. Sold in 1947 and broken up in 1951.
Balgowlah	1912-1951	Sold in 1953, broken up and hulk converted to lighter. Lighter scuttled near Iron Cove Bridge
Bellubera	1910-1973	broken up and hulk scuttled off Long Reef in 1980
Binngarra	1905-1930	Papua New Guinea store ship World War II, scuttled off Sydney 1946
Dee Why I	1928-1968	Sold Stride's Shipbreakers July 1968, broken up and hulk scuttled off Long Reef May 1976
Curl Curl I	1928-1960	Sold Stride's Shipbreakers July 1963, broken up and hulk scuttled off Sydney August 1969
South Steyne	1938-1974	Converted into a floating restaurant, currently laid up in Berrys Bay
Manly III	1965-1980	Sold to Hydrofoil Seaflight Services, Queensland
Fairlight II	1966-1984	Scrapped 1988
Dee Why II	1970-1984	Scrapped 1988
Curl Curl II	1973-1991	Sold 1992 to Ustica Lines, Italy & renamed Spargi

== See also ==
- List of Australian ferries
- List of Sydney Harbour ferries
- Timeline of Sydney Harbour ferries
