= Manly–Agnes collision =

Ship collision and shipwreck in Sydney Harbour, Australia, in 1904

Coordinates: 33.85°S 151.24°E

The Manly–Agnes collision was a 1904 shipwreck in Sydney Harbour, Australia. It involved the 30' launch Agnes and the steamer SS Manly which was a much larger passenger ferry. The Agnes was carrying a family between Snails Bay and Middle Harbour.

== Agnes ==
The Agnes was a launch owned by Frederick Thomas Heming. She had been completed in 1904 by W Holmes of North Sydney, New South Wales and was powered by a 5 hp (3.7 kW) Hercules engine.

== The collision ==
The collision occurred in the Sydney Harbour on a Sunday. The Manly ran into the Agnes hitting it near the stern. The Hemings family of six people on board the Agnes were thrown into the water. Mr. Heming and his wife Agnes drowned - their four children were rescued and survived.

== Aftermath ==
Captain Ward of the Manly was charged with manslaughter. The jury deliberated a short time before returning with a verdict of not guilty. Blame for the accident was placed on Hemings for turning into the path of the ferry. Captain Ward was admonished for not sounding the ferry's whistle.

The four Hemings children were orphaned by the loss of their parents. A fund was created to help the oldest son buy out the parents' laundry business.
