= SS Kuring-gai =

Ferry formerly serving the Manly route

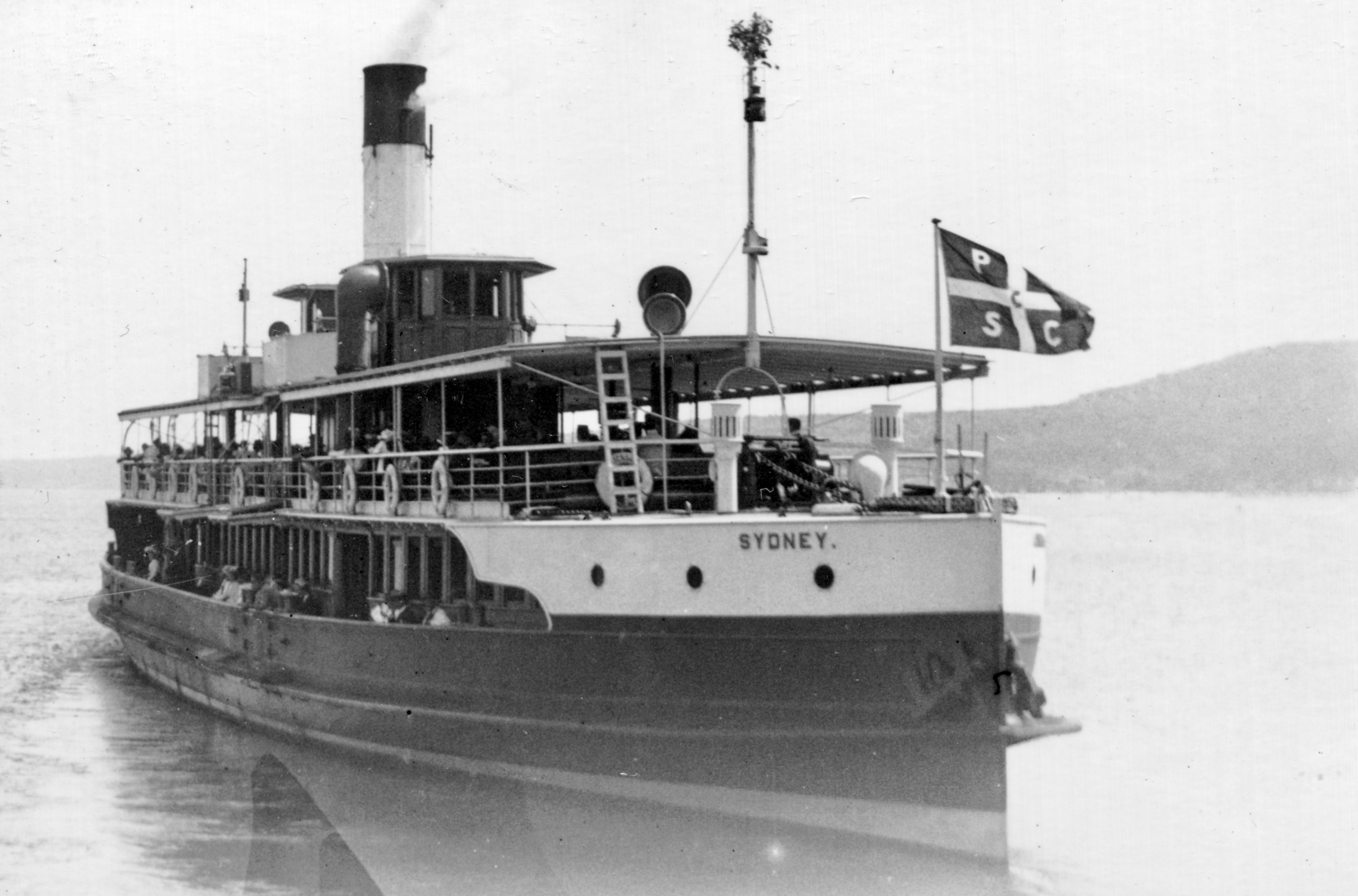
- Kuring-gai on Sydney Harbour

History
- Name: Kuring-gai
- Operator: Port Jackson & Manly Steamship Company
- Route: Manly
- Builder: Mort's Dock and Engineering
- Launched: 1901
- Out of service: 1928
- Fate: Hulked 1934, sunk post World War 2

General characteristics
- Tonnage: 497 tons
- Length: 51.8 m (169 ft 11 in)
- Beam: 9.5 m (31 ft 2 in)
- Height: 4.5 m (14 ft 9 in)
- Installed power: 85 NHP
- Propulsion: 3 cylinder tripled expansion steam engines
- Speed: 15 knots (28 km/h; 17 mph)
- Capacity: 1,228 passengers

SS Kuring-gai was a ferry that served on the Sydney to Manly run from 1901 to 1928.

An iron framed, steel-plated double-ended screw ferry, it was the archetype of the familiar Manly ferry shape of the 20th century.

The name Kuring-gai is derived from the "Guringai" Aboriginal people who were thought to be the traditional owners of the area immediately north of Sydney. More contemporary research suggests that this was not the case.

== Design and construction ==
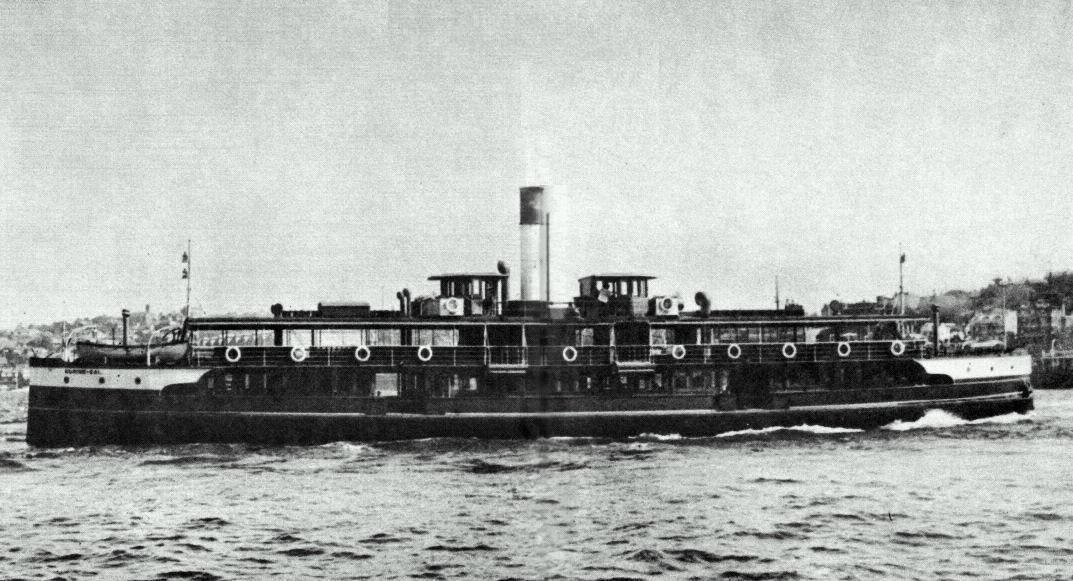
Manly Ferry Kuring-gai near new c. 1910

Kuring-gai was ordered by the Port Jackson Co-operative Steamship Co. Ltd, which became the Port Jackson and Manly Steamship Company. The vessel was designed by renowned naval architect, Walter Reeks and was a development of Reeks' previous Manly ferry, the wooden Manly. Kuring-gai's wheelhouses were located immediately adjacent either side of her single funnel. She was the first Manly ferry to have gangway exits on both upper and lower decks. The subsequent Binngarra-type of vessels were larger versions of Kuring-gai but with wheel houses at the far ends of the upper deck.

Her basic design was emulated on eleven ferries that formed the twentieth century fleet of Manly ferries; namely the Binngarra-type ferries, the two Dee Why-class ferries and the South Steyne. This layout is also seen in the four current Freshwater-class ferries introduced in the 1980s and still operating.

Kuring-gai was built in 1901 at Mort's Dock and Engineering in Balmain. Her triple expansion steam engines, also supplied by Mort's Dock, generated 85 hp. She reached 15.66 knots on her trials on 28 April 1901.

== Service life ==
Kuring-gai ran her first revenue trip to Manly on the 11 May 1901. The high standard of passenger accommodation including polished timbers, mirrors and electric lights was greatly appreciated by passengers.

In 1905, Kuring-gai overshot the wharf at Circular Quay and became stuck in a hole that the new Binngarra had created when it too crashed four days earlier. Kuring-gai was freed by the paddle steamer, Brighton.

Kuring-gai was reboilered in 1922. Her capacity of 1,228 passengers became too small for the booming Manly route, particularly in comparison to the larger Binngarra class ferries that had been subsequently introduced. Following the arrival of the fast and big Dee Why and Curl Curl from Scotland, she was sold to Newcastle Ferries Ltd in 1928 and used as a ferry at Walsh Island, now known as Kooragang. She was also used to run excursions to Raymond Terrace, Nelson Bay and Broughton Island.

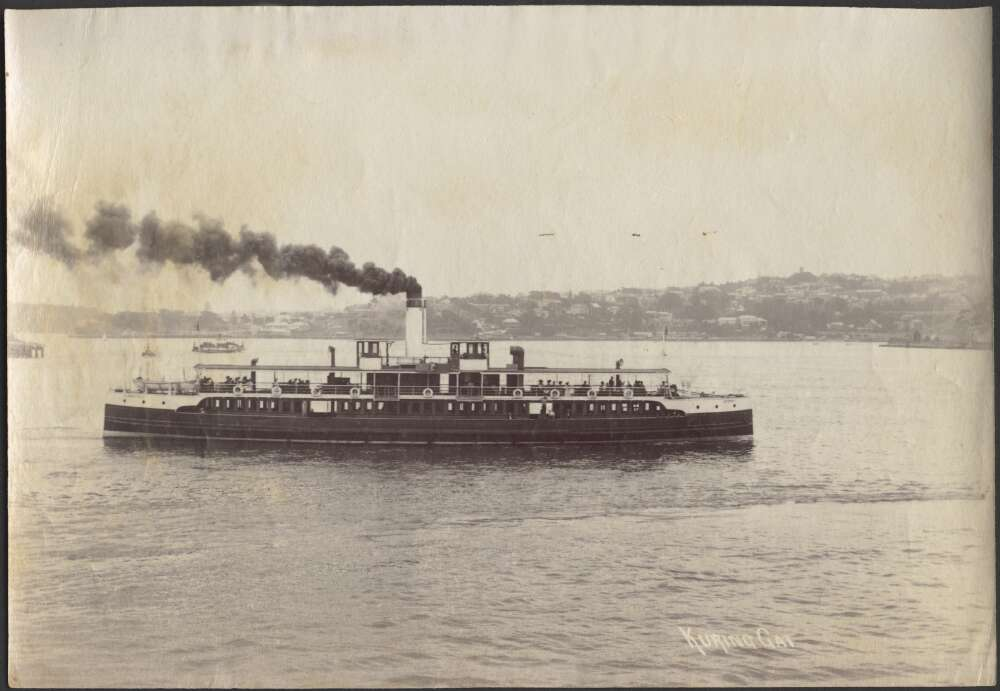
Near Bradleys Head, steaming towards Circular Quay

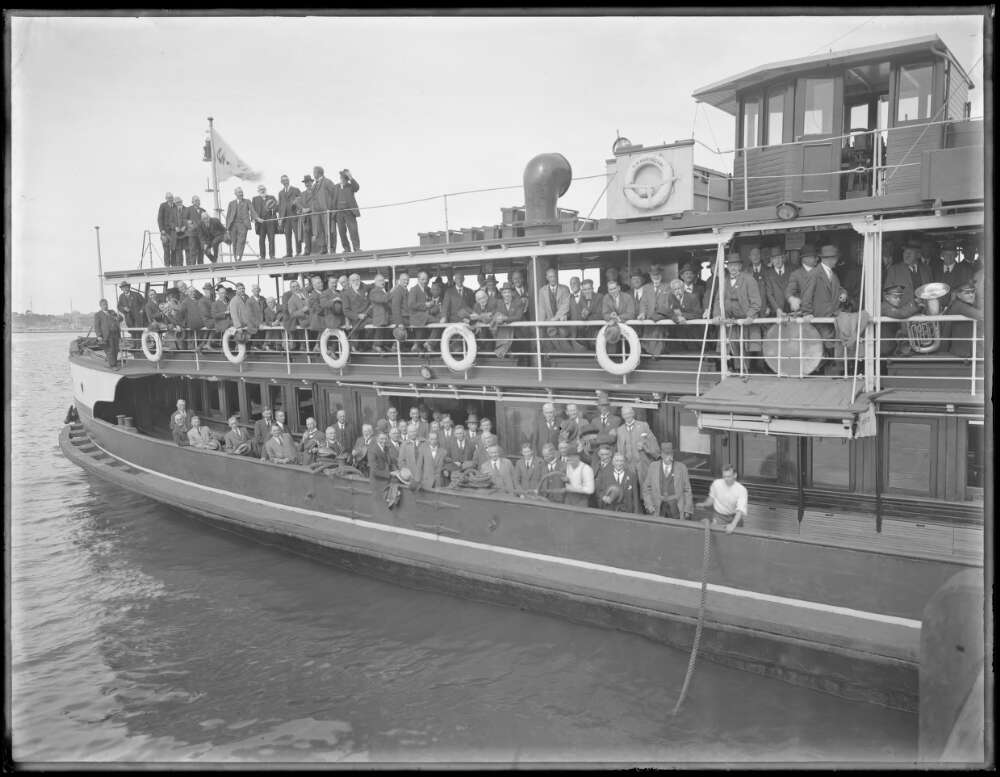
on Sydney Harbour, 1920

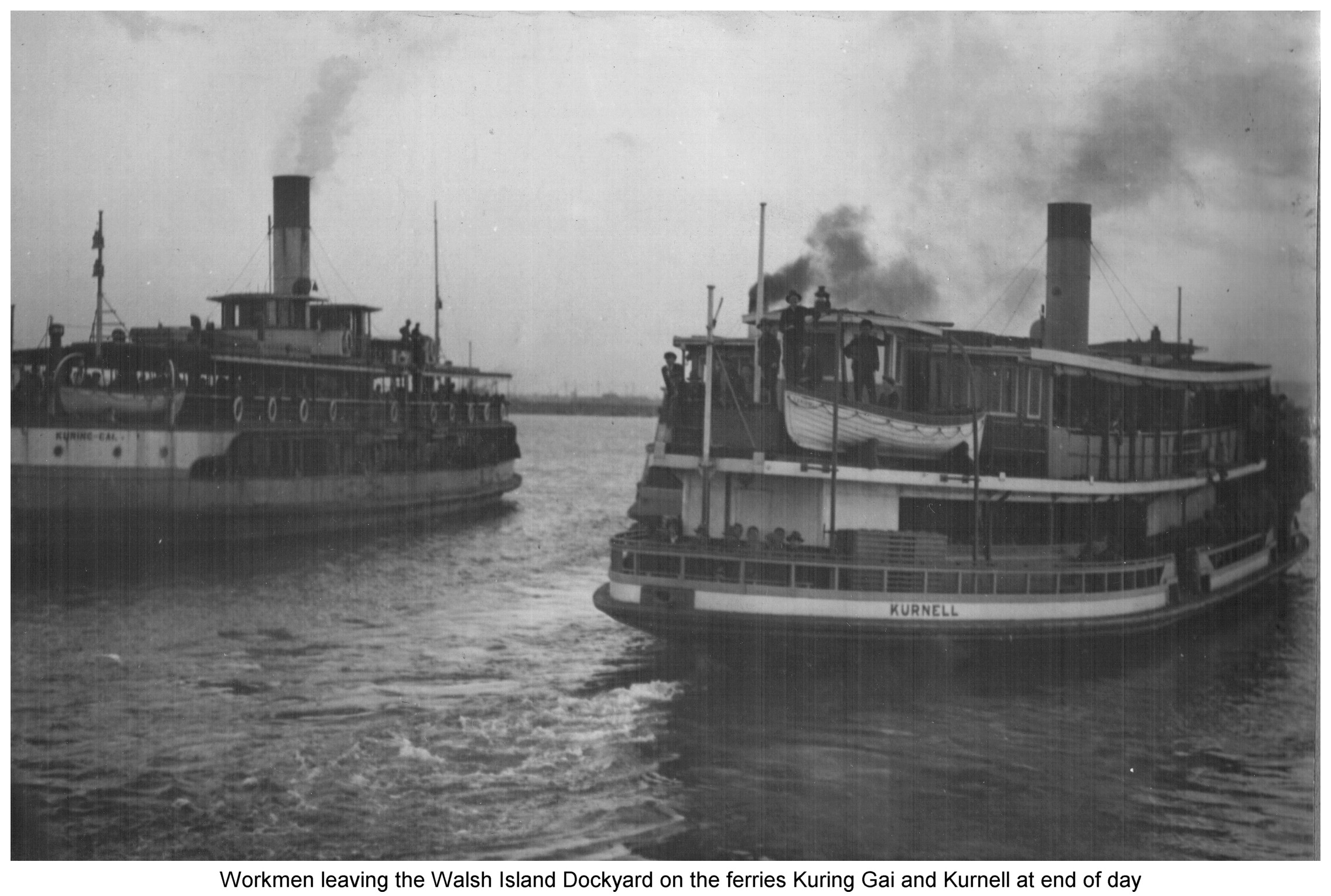
With ferry Kurnell at Walsh Island Dockyard (between 1928 and 1934)

== Demise ==
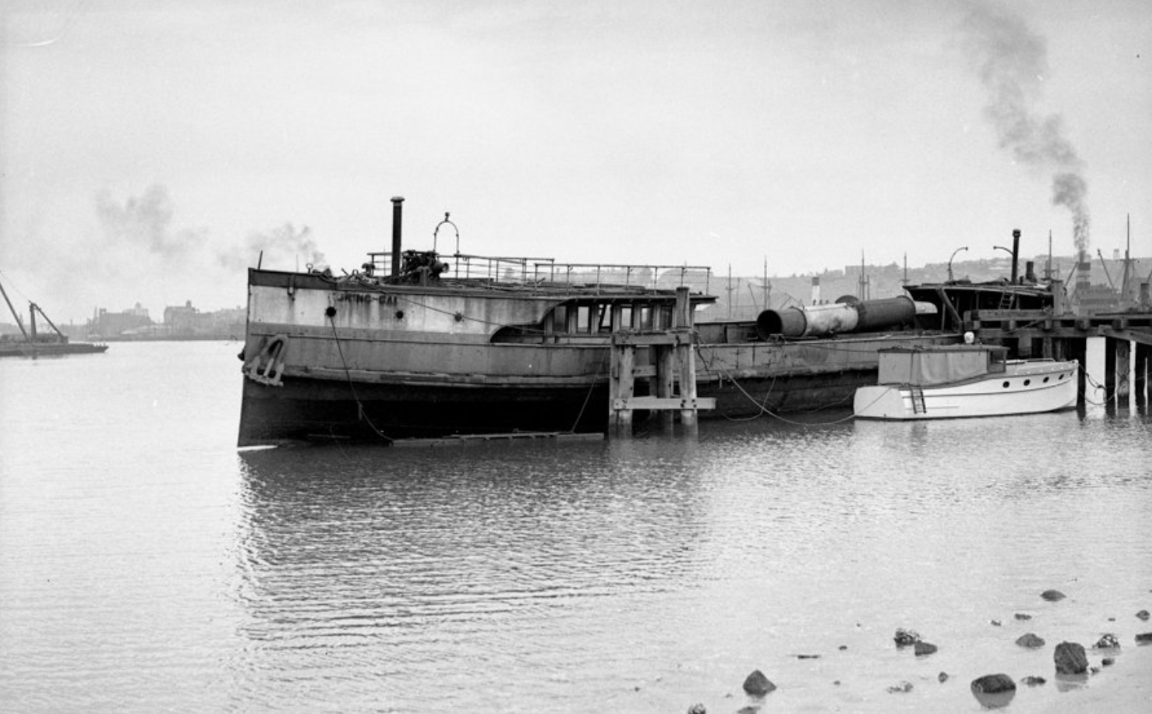
Hulked in Newcastle, 1936

She was tied up and hulked in 1934. The wooden superstructure was demolished and in World War II, US forces used her in New Guinea as a storage barge. After the War, the vessel was towed back to Newcastle, moored at Hexham and at one point sank in the mud near Hexham Bridge where she is still visible.
