= SS Manly =

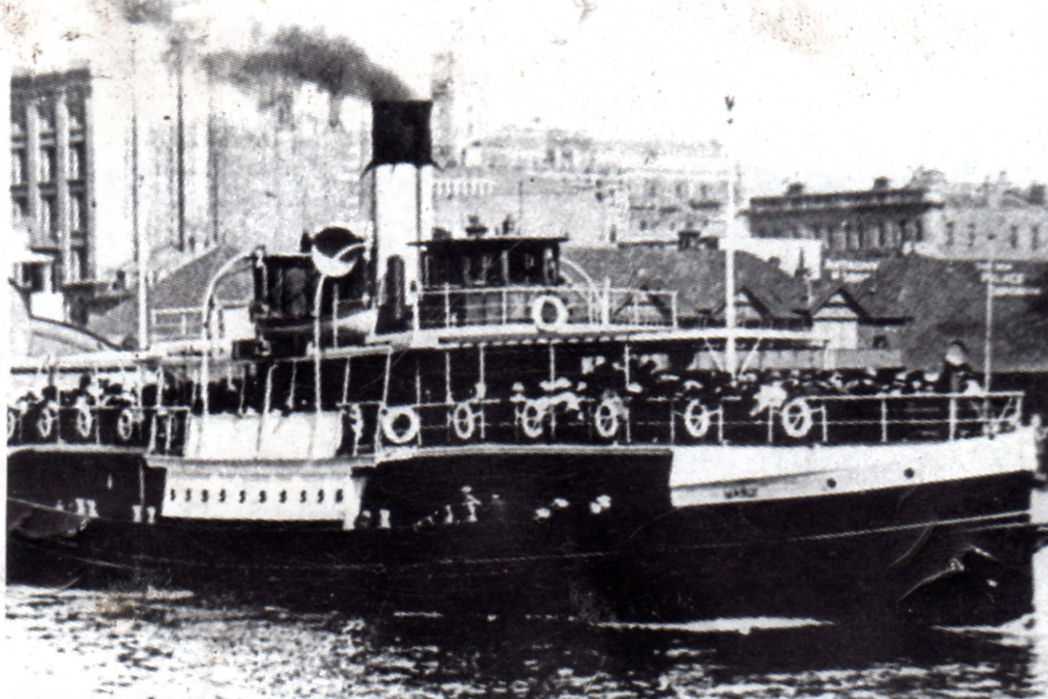
- Manly (II) leaving Circular Quay on a run to Manly

History
- Name: Manly (II)
- Operator: Port Jackson & Manly Steamship Company
- Port of registry: Sydney
- Route: Manly
- Builder: Young, Son & Fletcher
- Completed: 1896
- Out of service: 1924
- Fate: Broken up 1926

General characteristics
- Tonnage: 229 tons
- Length: 44.8 m (147 ft 0 in)
- Beam: 7.9 m (25 ft 11 in)
- Decks: 2
- Installed power: 100 NHP,
- Propulsion: 3 cylinder tripled expansion steam engines
- Speed: 14 knots (26 km/h; 16 mph)
- Capacity: 820 passengers

Manly (II) was a ferry that served on the Sydney to Manly run from 1896 to 1924.

Designed by renowned naval architect Walter Reeks, Manly was the first double-ended screw ferry on the Manly run. She, along with Kuring-gai (1901), were the archetypes for the long run of Manly ferries for most of the twentieth century.

== Background ==
In the 1880s, the Port Jackson Steamship Company Limited had been expanding its paddle steamer fleet and services to Manly from Sydney (Circular Quay). Without competition, fares also rose. In response, local interests set up the Manly Co-operative Steam Ferry Limited in 1893 that ran a service with chartered single-ended screw steamers. While a price-war ensued, the new company's smaller and open vessels (Cygnet, Admiral, Conqueror, and Marramarra) could not match Port Jackson's larger vessels, which included Brighton, Fairlight, Narrabeen. However, patronage for both companies increased significantly.

To entice a bigger share of the expanding market, the Manly Co-op ordered a 700-passenger steamer to be named Emancipator. The company commissioned renowned naval architect Walter Reeks to design her. But by 1896, when the older company dropped prices to threepence return and the high cost of building the new Emancipator, the Manly Co-Op collapsed. The Port Jackson Co took over the Manly Co-op's interests (including the nearly completed Emancipator) and changed its name to Port Jackson Co-operative Steamship Co. Ltd. The name of the near complete "Emancipator" was dropped in favour of "Manly".

== Design and construction ==
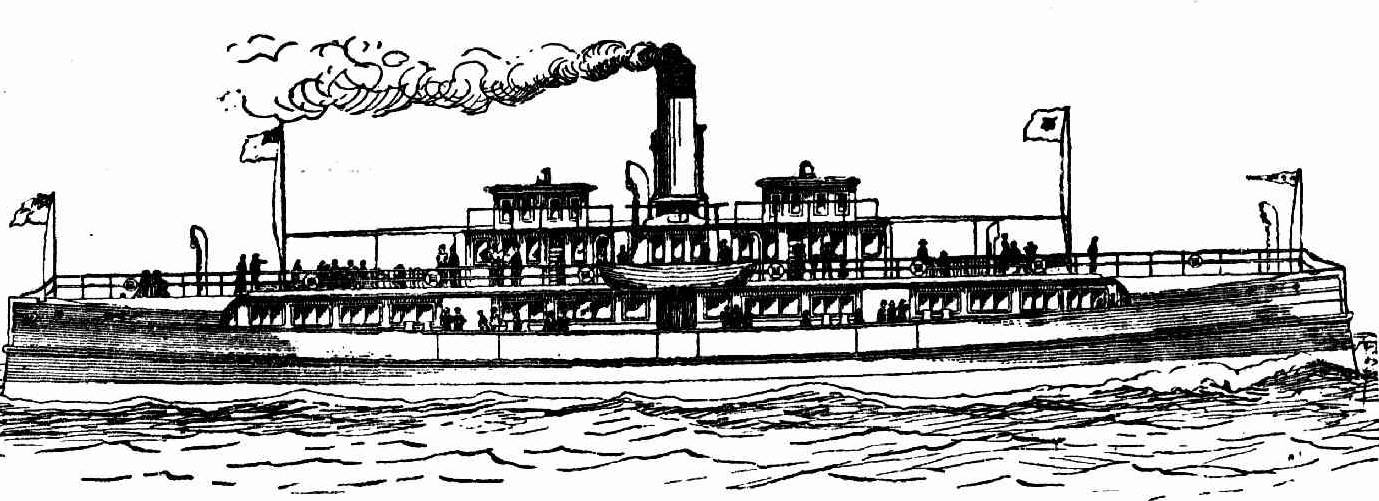
Concept drawing of Manly

The new ferry boat was built by Young, Son & Fletcher in Balmain, New South Wales. She was a double-ended double-screw vessel of wooden-construction. A product of the competitive market and designed to capture the market, she was an innovative vessel. She became the archetype for the familiar Manly ferries throughout the twentieth century. She had high forecastles at either end to run at speed through the deep-sea conditions across the Sydney Heads. Her basic design was further refined with the subsequent steel and larger ferry Kuring-gai (1906), the six Binngarra-class vessels, culminating in the Scottish-built Dee Why and Curl Curl and South Steyne. Unlike her predecessors, Manly had two wheelhouses both placed immediately fore and aft of her funnel. She had an open promenade deck and an enclosed lower deck.

She measured 44.8 m (147 ft 0 in) long (only two-thirds the length of Brighton) with a beam of 7.9 m (25 ft 11 in). At 229 tons, she was approximately half the size of the Binngarra-type ferries. Her 100 hp engine, built by Fawcett, Preston and Company (of England), was the first triple expansion steam engines in a Manly ferry. Capable of over 14 knots, she could carry 820 passengers. Her wooden construction allowed the continuous propeller shaft to lose its alignment resulting in severe vibration. This was relieved when her three-bladed propellers were replaced with four-bladed ones.

== Service history ==
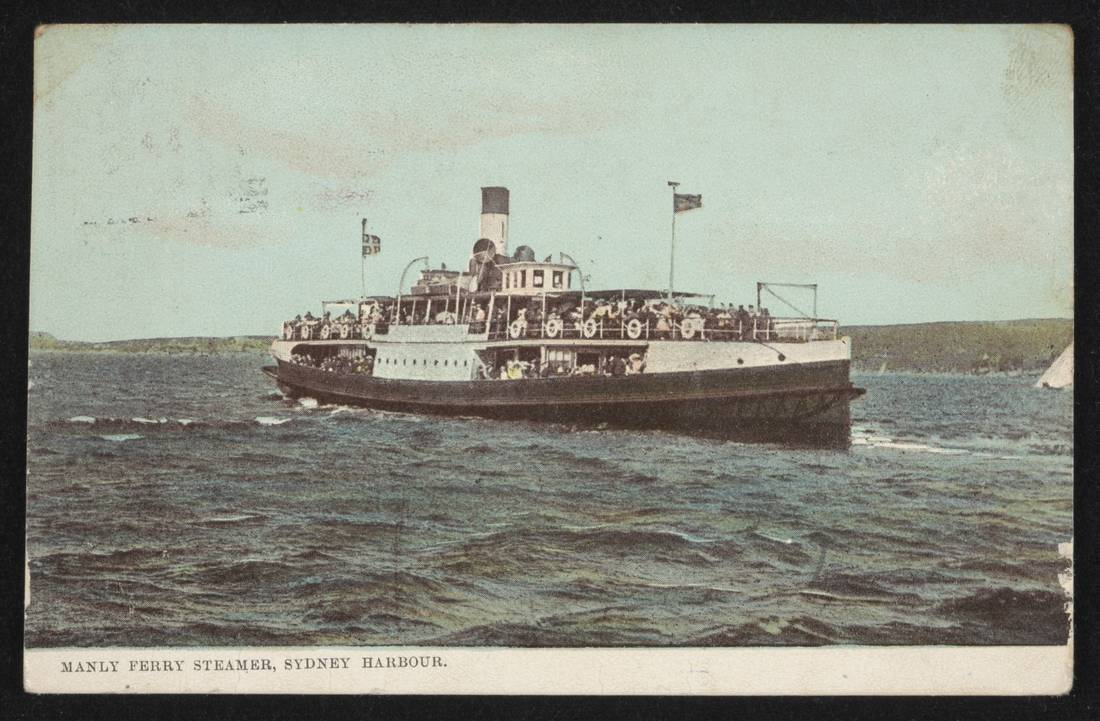
SS Manly (1896) on Sydney Harbour (1905)

Ordered by the Manly Co-op, she was to have been named Emancipator and she was not christened at her launch due to the merger negotiations following the Manly Co-o'ps failure. Two days after her launch, on the 14 of June 1896, the two competing companies began the process to amalgamate and shortly thereafter she received her name, "Manly".

After a period of fitting out, Manly ran her trials on 30 October 1896 where she covered the measured mile in a little over 4 minutes, exceeding expectations. Her trials were run under Captain Clark of the Balmain Ferry Company.

On 18 December, she collided with the collier Merksworth. Manly suffered no damage, but Merksworth's bridge and upper works were damaged from the overhanging bow of the ferry and Manly’s leading propeller had gouged a large hole in the collier’s hull. Merksworth managed to beach near Mosman Bay and there were no deaths. Captain Thomas Capuru, master of the Manly, was found to be at fault and his masters’ certificate was suspended for three months.

By the late 1890s, conditions on the Manly ferries were extremely crowded on weekends and holidays. No attempt was made to run the boats to a timetable, they simply loaded and ran. Following Christmas 1898, the masters of Fairlight and Manly both received fines for overcrowding. Crowd control was ineffective at both the Manly and Circular Quay wharves. As a result of this penalty, the ferry was equipped with iron gates – something that would be standard on later ferries – and turnstiles were erected at both wharves. With increasing demand and overcrowding, the Port Jackson Co ordered the first of what was to become the Binngarra-type vessels that were significantly larger and higher capacity.

On the night of 30 June 1901, while Manly was crossing Sydney Heads in a gale with fifty passengers, heavy waves broke over her near South Head and the engines stopped and could not be restarted. Wallowing beam to the waves, she drifted towards North Head. The large paddle steamer, Brighton, towed Manly into North Harbour where she was safely beached and her engines were restarted. Brighton took her own passengers on to Manly wharf and returned to find the Manly grounded in the soft sand. A line was run from the Manly to the beach and the passengers were taken off four or five at a time through the heavy surf of Manly Cove.

In 1904, she was involved in a fatal collision with the launch Agnes on Sydney Harbour. The 30 foot launch turned directly into the path of the Manly and the much larger Manly smashed into the launch sinking her. Two people drowned, a mother and father, leaving behind a family of four orphans who were rescued from the crash. An investigation placed the blame for the collision on the captain of the Agnes. The captain of the Manly was admonished for not sounding the steam whistle.

Manly went on to lead a remaining quiet life. In 1922, she set a record time of 22 minutes for the trip to Manly, a time which has not been beaten by any conventional mono displacement hull ferry since (hydrofoils did the run in 15 minutes).

== Decommissioning ==
While Manly was innovative and fast, she was too small. Unlike the previous paddlers and subsequent Binngarra-type screw vessels, which were larger and a number of which could carry 1,500 passengers, her capacity of 820 was not enough for the crowds on the Manly run. With the introduction of the bigger Binngarra-type ferries, she was increasingly being used as spare boat only. When Baragoola was launched in 1922, the wooden Manly was laid up permanently. In early 1924, she was advertised for sale, eventually selling for six hundred pounds to W M Ford of Berrys Bay. In 1926, her engines were removed to be installed in the island trader Madal and she was broken up later that year.
