= Walter Reeks =

- Born: 25 February 1861; Christchurch, Hampshire, England
- Died: 2 October 1925 (aged 64); Mosman, New South Wales, Australia
- Occupation: Naval architect

Walter Reeks (25 February 1861 – 2 October 1925) was one of the earliest naval architects in Australia and is known for designing yachts, ferries and coastal ships.

He was born in Christchurch, England and migrated to Australia in 1885.

Reeks apprenticed with Alexander Richardson and at shipbuilders George Inman & Sons in England. He became an expert at yacht design and propulsion.

He was active in the Sydney yachting community on arrival in Australia and joined several of the yacht clubs and engineering associations. He was Vice Commodore for the Royal Sydney Yacht Squadron from 1906 to 1910. He was president of the NSW Engineering Association in 1914.

He worked for various Sydney ferry companies between 1890 and 1915, a period in which the ferry system saw significant growth. He designed the first double-ended-screw Manly ferry, the Manly (II), and the Kuring-gai, which became the model for Manly ferries of the first half of the 20th century. Other Sydney ferries designed by Reeks, including all but one of the early-20th-century 'Lady' ferries, such as the Lady Denman and Lady Scott, and all of the Watsons Bay ferries, such as the Vaucluse. He also designed the Hobart ferries Derwent and Rosny.

Reeks married Mary Emma Kent in March 1889. They had a daughter, Thelma, and son, Kent. Mary died in 1895 and Reeks married again in 1900. Reeks's son was murdered in England in 1914.

Reeks died in October 1925. Several of his yachts are extant as of 2018, including Boomerang and Ena in Sydney.
