= Barrenjoey =

Barrenjoey may mean or refer to:

- Barrenjoey, New South Wales, a headland at the northern end of Palm Beach, New South Wales
- Barrenjoey Peninsula, the landmass spanning much of the Northern Beaches region of Sydney, New South Wales
- Barrenjoey Capital Partners, an Australian Investment Bank
- Barrenjoey Road, a road through the Northern Beaches, Sydney, New South Wales
- Barrenjoey Head Lighthouse, a lighthouse on Barrenjoey headland
- SS Barrenjoey, later MV North Head, a Manly ferry on Sydney Harbour
