= Kirrule-type ferry =

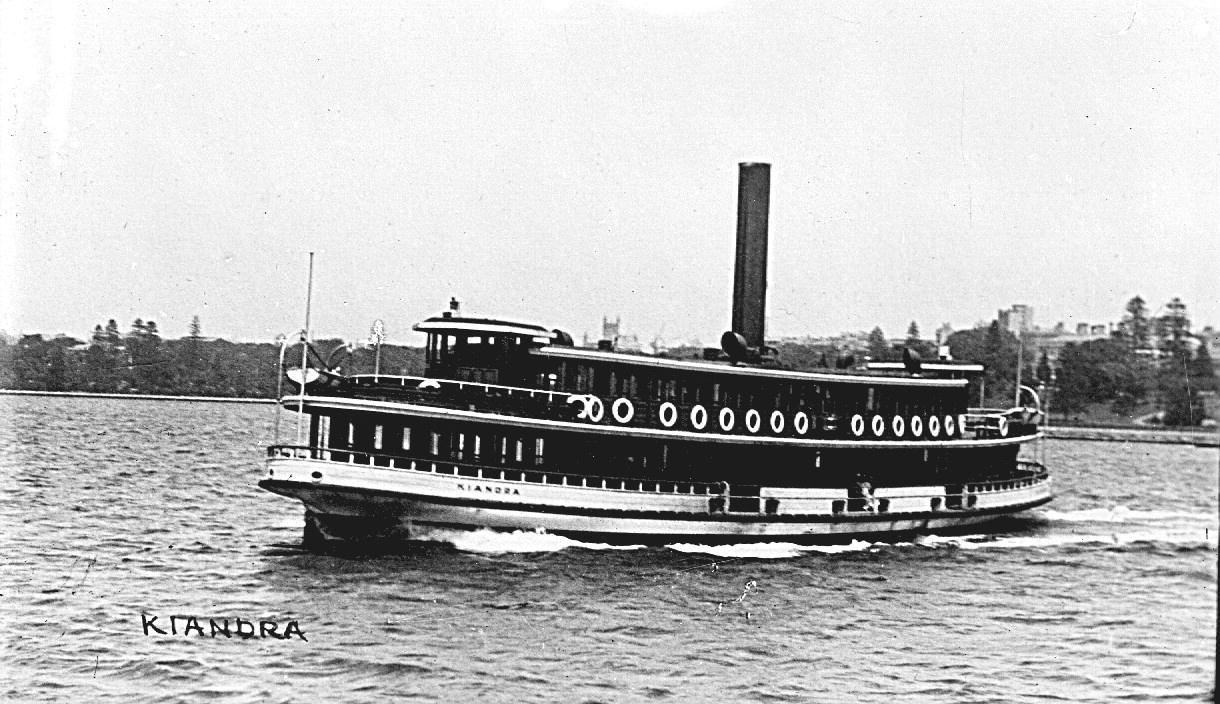
- Kiandra as built, in her original livery

History
- Name: Kiandra, Kirrule and Kubu
- Operator: Sydney Ferries Limited; Sydney Harbour Transport Board
- Port of registry: Sydney
- Builder: Morrison & Sinclair Ltd, at Balmain
- Cost: Kirrule: £16,415, Kiandra: £17,087, and Kubu: £17,138.
- Launched: Kirrule 1910, Kiandra 1911, Kubu 1912
- Out of service: Kirrule and Kiandra 1951, Kubu 1959
- Identification: Kubu: O/N 131525

General characteristics
- Tonnage: 258 tonnes
- Length: 42.7 m
- Beam: 9.2 m
- Propulsion: 60hp triple-expansion steam.
- Capacity: 1072, 1080, 1010

The Kirrule-type ferries (or Kubu-class) – Kiandra, Kirrule and Kubu – were three identical K-class ferries that operated on Sydney Harbour by Sydney Ferries Limited.

The three steam ferries were built in 1910, 1911 and 1912 at the height of the boom in ferry traffic across Sydney Harbour prior to the opening of the Sydney Harbour Bridge. They were the second largest type of inner harbour vessels and built for the rapidly increasing North Shore demand.

Sydney Ferries Limited generally choose Australian Aboriginal names for the early twentieth "K-class" steamers. "Kiandra" is a corruption of Aboriginal 'Gianderra' for 'sharp stones for knives' and a town in NSW. Kirrule is thought to mean 'aroused', and 'Kubu' "oak tree".

== Design and construction ==
When built, they were the most refined of the K-class ferries, and among the largest of the type. As with all Sydney ferries at the time, they were steamers but were not among those ferries later converted to diesel power. Like all K-class ferries to date, the boats were all timber-hulled with timber superstructures. Later K-class ferries - sisters Kanangra and Kirawa (1912) and sisters Koompartoo and Kuttabul (1922) - were steel hulled with timber decks and superstructures.

The Kirrule-type continued the K-class double-deck, double-ended screw propulsion, rounded bows with two raised wheelhouses and a single tall funnel. They had enclosed upper and lower saloons with lower deck outdoor seating around the vessel, and the upper decks had smaller outdoor areas at either end around the wheelhouses.

Kirrule, Kiandra, and Kubu were built by Morrison & Sinclair Ltd, at Balmain and launched in 1910, 1911, and 1912 respectively. They cost £16,415, £17,087, and £17,138 respectively. Their 68 hp triple expansion steam engines, built by Mort's Dock & Engineering Co Ltd, pushed them to 12 knots - considerably greater power than earlier vessels of the same size so that longer runs to Mosman Bay were quicker.

As built, the three ferries followed the standard Sydney Ferries Limited livery of the time; varnished timber superstructure, black hulls, and white bulwarks and trim and black funnels. In the 1930s, following the opening of the Sydney Harbour bridge, the white trim and varnished timber was painted over with a green and cream colour scheme.

== Service history ==
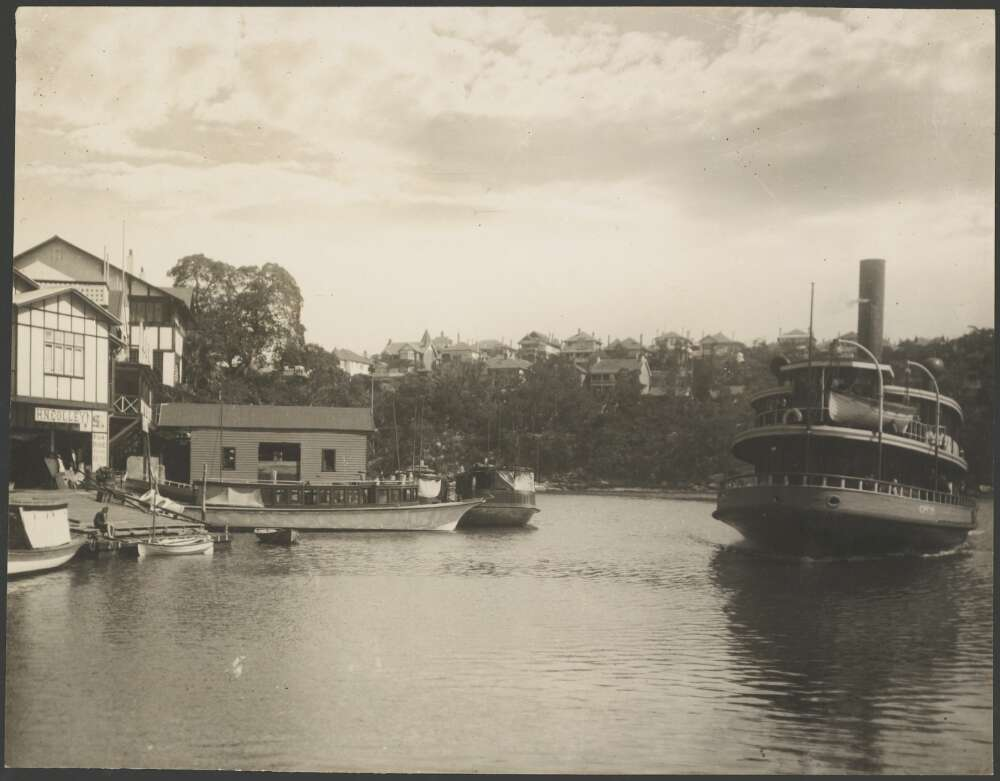
Kubu arriving at Mosman Bay wharf, c. 1920

In the early twentieth century and up to the opening of the Sydney Harbour Bridge in 1932, demand for Sydney Ferries Limited service across the harbour grew rapidly. Sydney Ferries Limited with a near monopoly on the inner-harbour (ie, non-Manly) services, had built up one of the largest ferry fleets in the world. Kirrule, Kiandra and Kubu were the second largest type of inner harbour vessels and were built to meet the increasing North Shore demand.

The three ferries, along with fellow K-class ferry, Kookooburra were used in the 1920s as weekend excursion vessels including carrying spectators to follow popular sailing races on Sydney Harbour.

All three ferries survived the opening of the Sydney Harbour Bridge when much of the fleet was quickly decommissioned as annual passenger numbers dropped from 40 million to 15 million. At midnight the day of the opening of the bridge on 19 March 1932, Kirrule was the last ferry to run the suddenly redundant Circular Quay to Milson's Point run.

Passenger numbers continued to fall after World War 2 to around 9 million annually, and the privately operated Sydney Ferries Ltd fleet was taken over by the NSW State Government in 1951. Kirrule and Kiandra was laid up as part of a rationalisation of the now largely redundant larger ferries. Kubu was considered for conversion to diesel power, however, the conversion didn't happen and she and Kiandra were broken up in 1953.

Kubu survived the State Government's 1952/53 purge of the fleet. While Kanangra was being converted from steam to diesel power in the late 1950s, Kubu was the heavy lift ferry of the inner-harbour fleet. With Kanangra's 1959 return to service - now as a diesel vessel - Kubu was laid up. She was the last coal-fired steam ferry on Port Jackson (oil-fired steamer South Steyne was in service until 1974). Kubu was laid up in Blackwattle Bay where she settled into the mud. In the mid-1960s, she was towed to Kerosene Bay near Waverton and burnt in June 1965.

== Incidents ==
- On 25 July 1928, Koompartoo collided with Kirrule at Circular Quay, with the latter suffering substantial damage. Kirrule was returning from Athol and had her bulwarks and rails damaged. The crash occurred about 200 m from the wharf, causing women to scream and drop their parcels. Once the danger had passed, passengers retrieved their belongings with one woman seen searching for cash that she had dropped in her excitement.
- Kiandra collided with the fast Manly ferry Curl Curl on the 30 April 1930. The steel Curl Curl suffered no damage whereas Kiandra was pulled from service with extensive damage to her sponson along one side.
- On a Saturday evening service to Mosman in June 1930, Kiandra loses rudder control and drifts across busy shipping and boat lanes from Bennelong Point to Milsons Point, and back across to Sydney Cove. The rudder shaft is damaged putting her rear rudder out of action, however, use of the forward rudder is counter-acted by the uncontrollable rear rudder. Ferry Kookooburra is lashed to Kiandra mid-channel and passengers are transferred.
- 30 January 1940 - Kubu collided with Barrenjoey causing significant damage to her timber bow, whereas, the larger steel Barrenjoey was only slightly damaged.
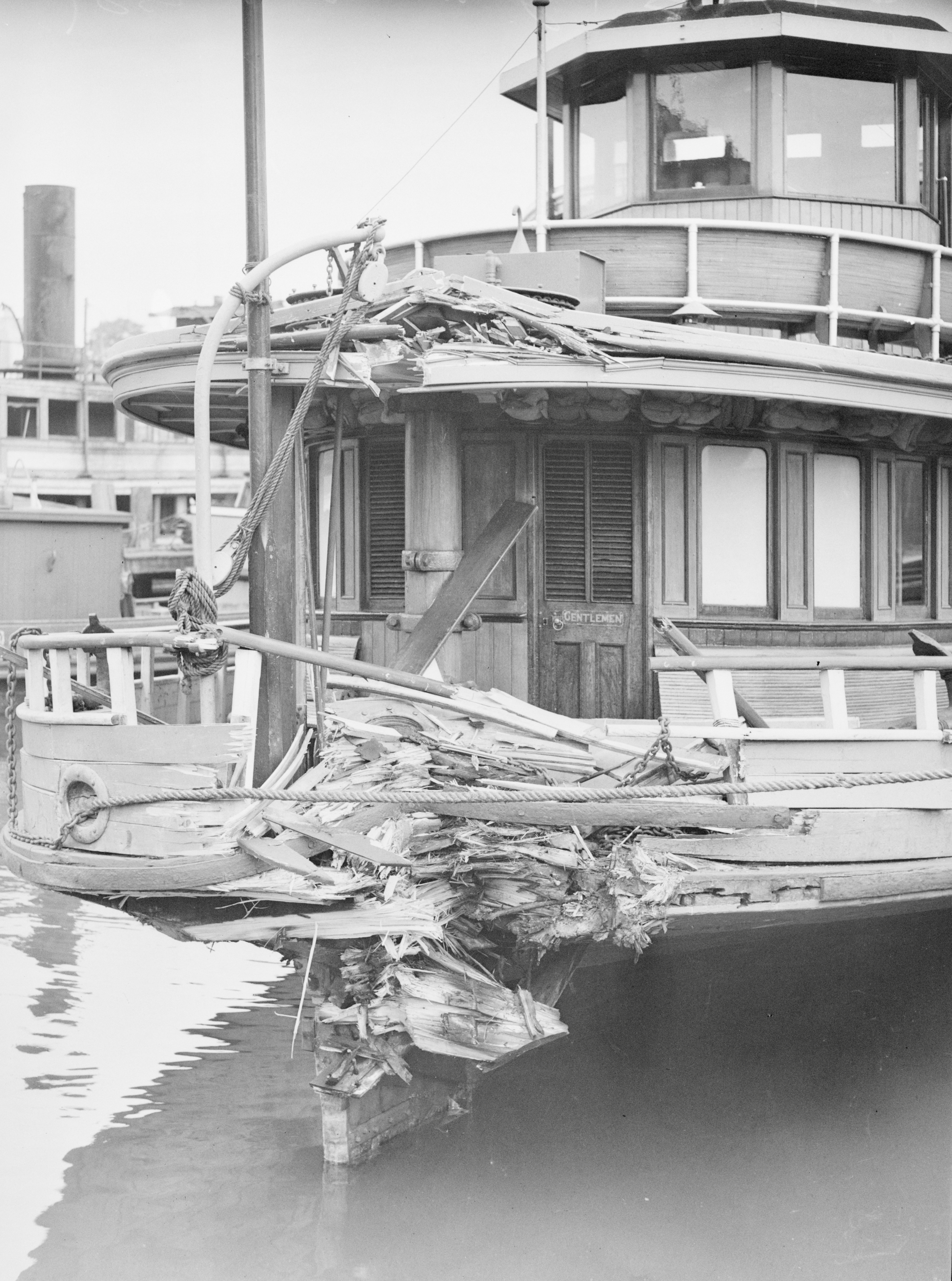
Kubu after collision with Barrenjoey

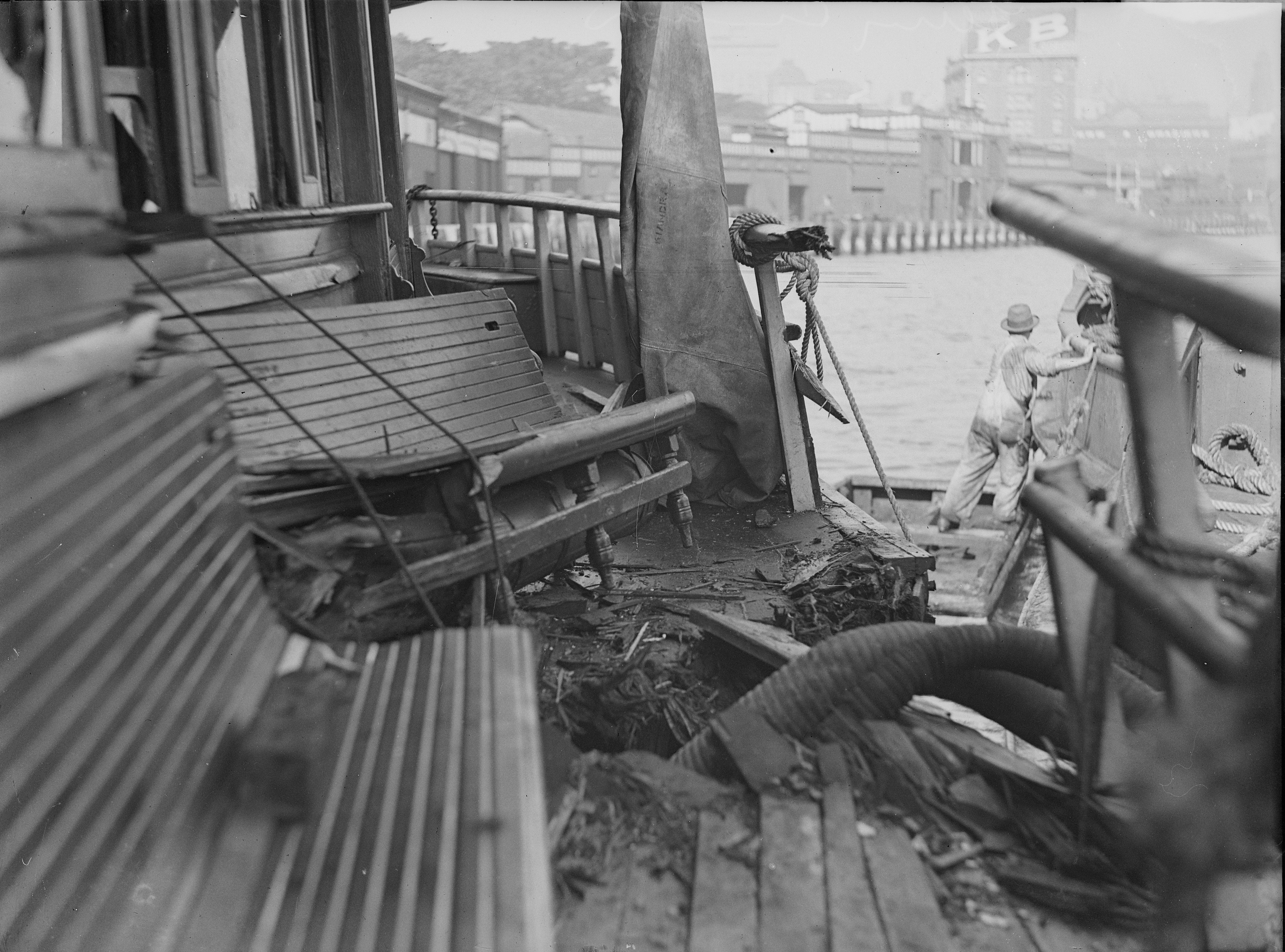
Kiandra after a collision with the Curl Curl, Sydney, 1 May 1930

== Kirrule ==
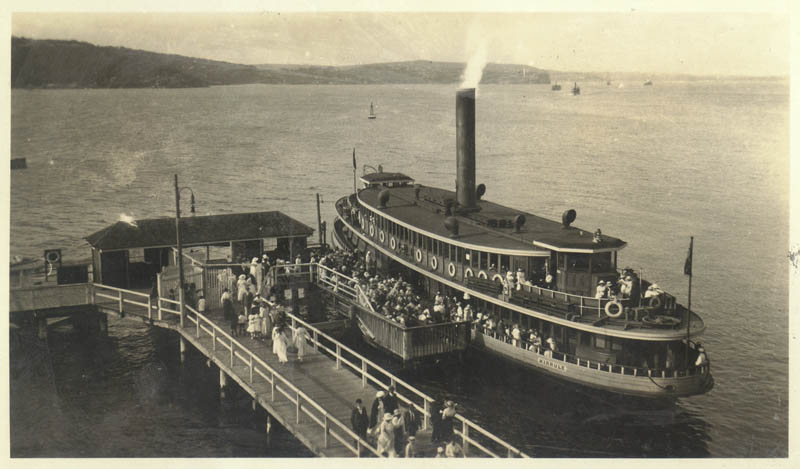
Kirrule with picnickers at Nielsen Park circa 1914

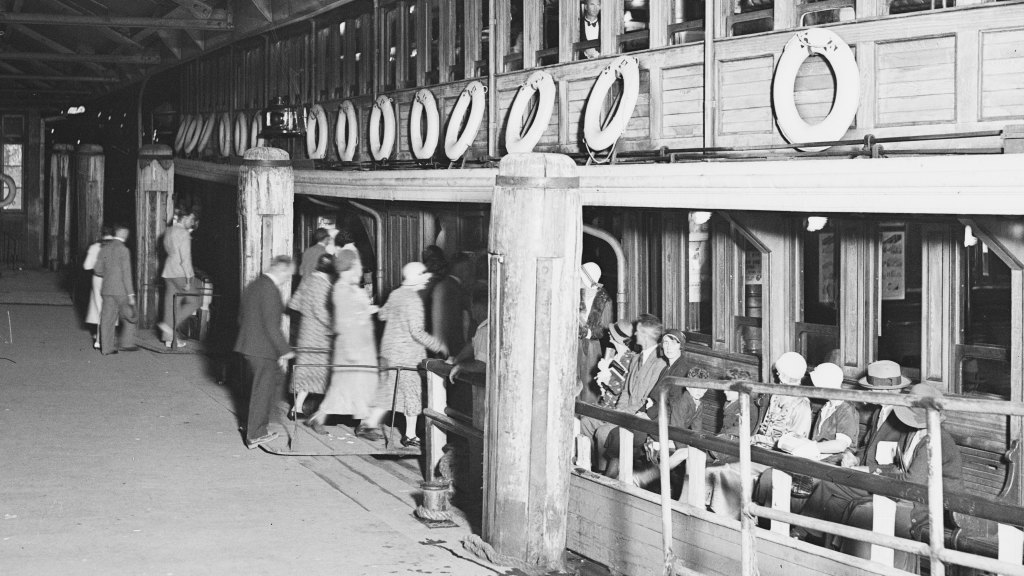
Kirrule at Circular Quay as the last ferry to Milsons Point, midnight 19 March 1932 after the opening of the Sydney Harbour Bridge earlier that day.

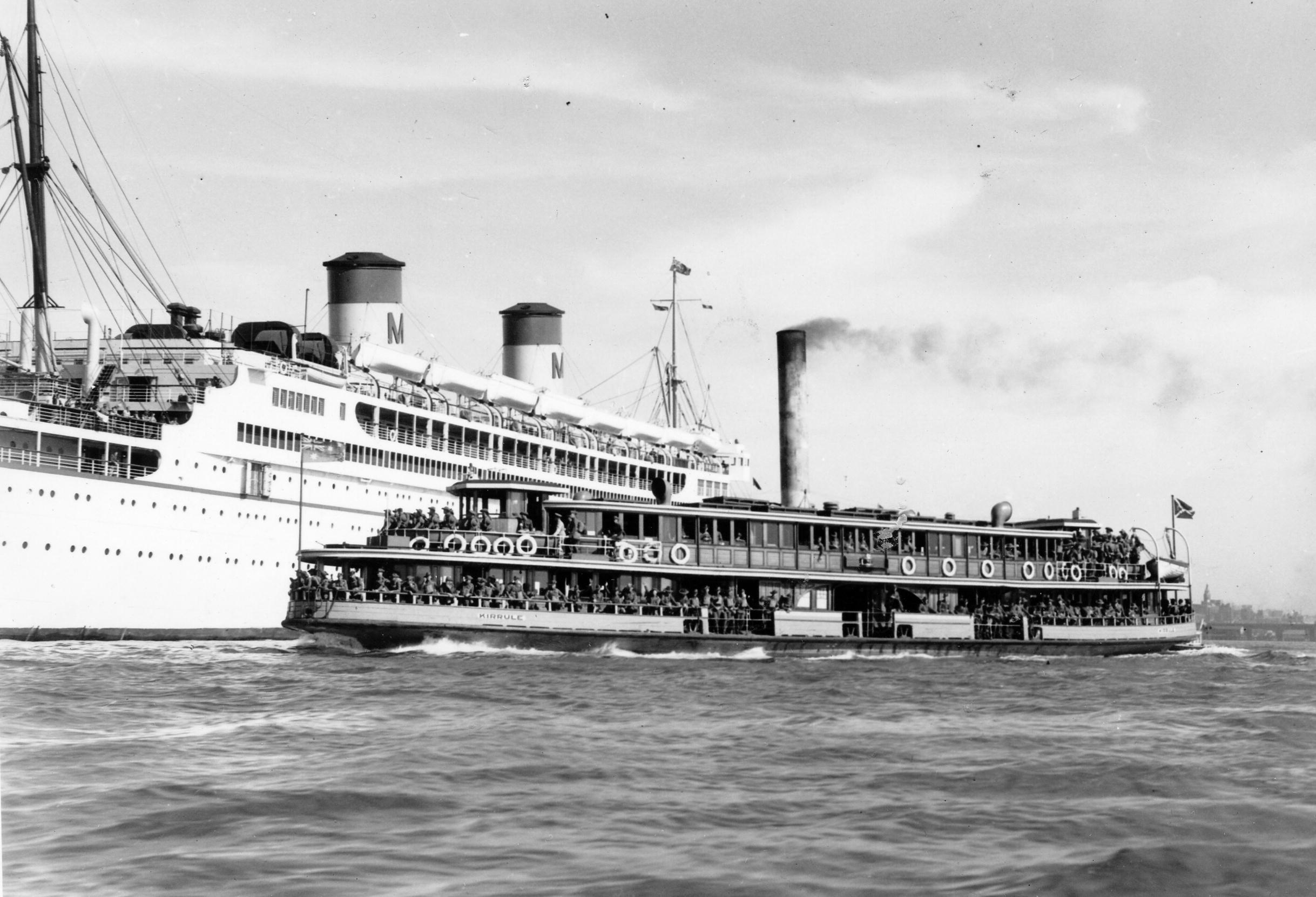
Kirrule transporting troops across the harbour during World War II

== Kiandra ==
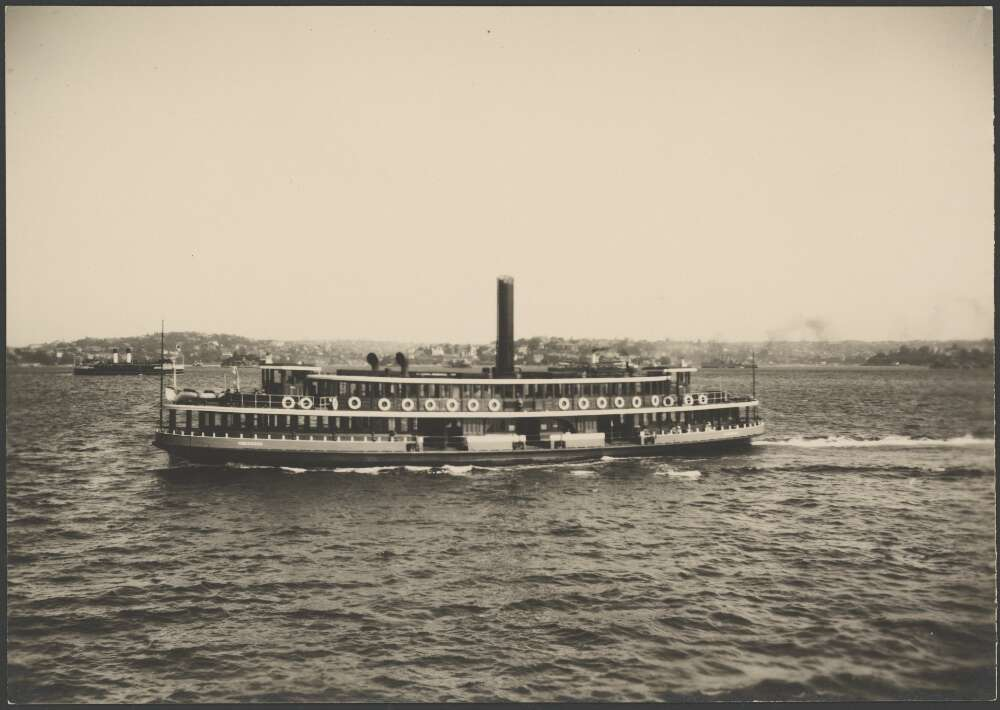
Kiandra in her original livery varnished timber, with grey and white trim

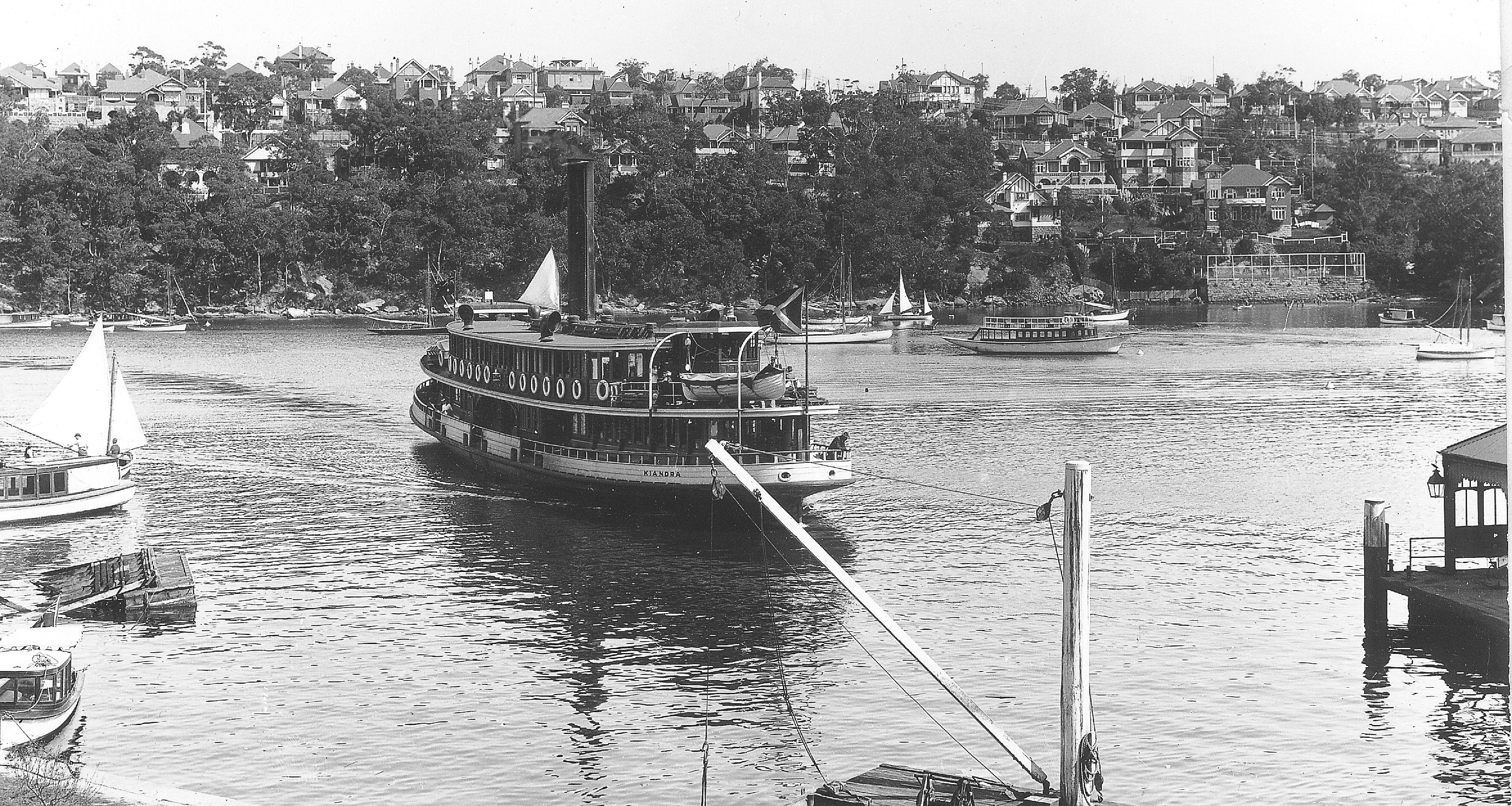
Kiandra approaching Mosman Bay Wharf, 1915

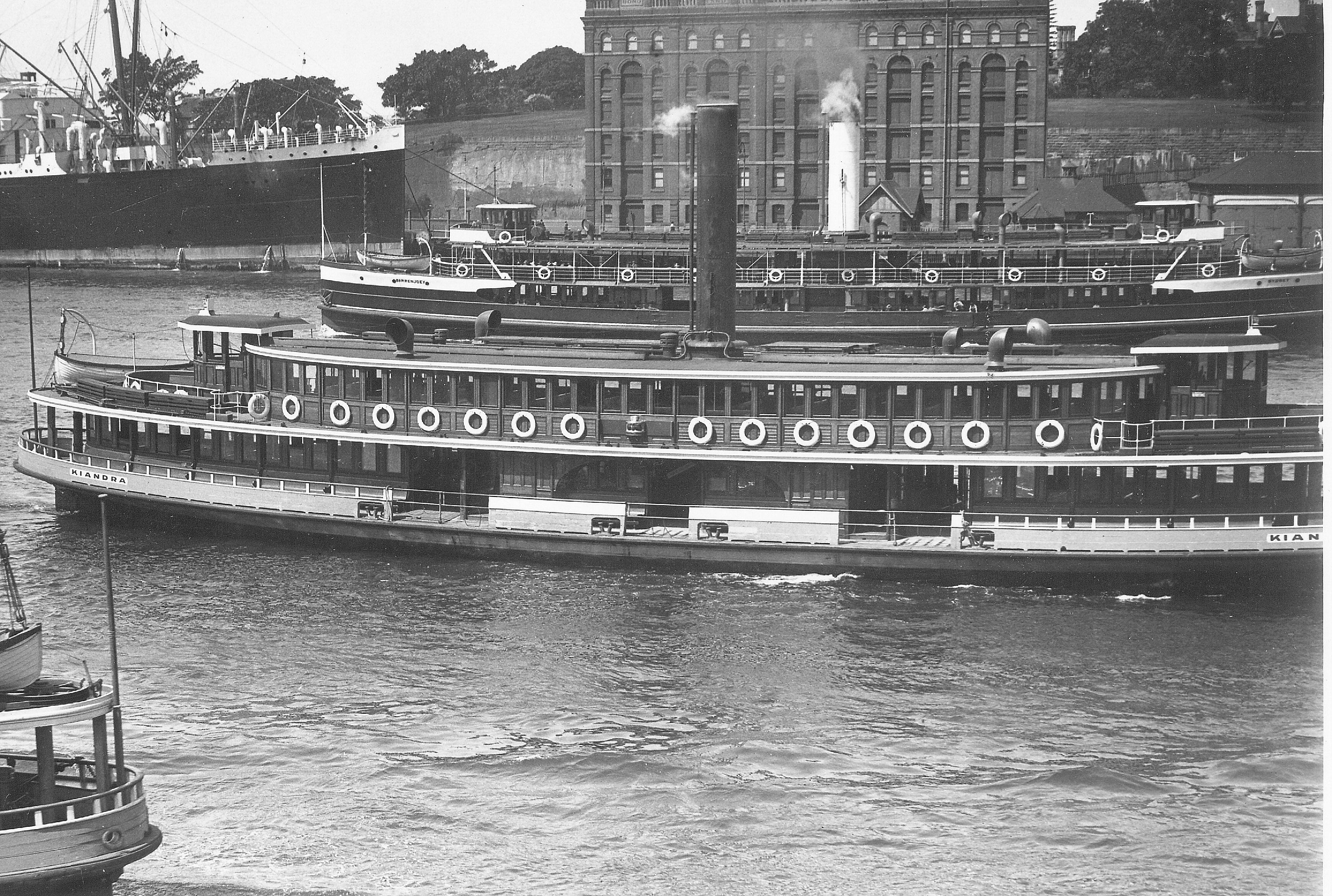
Kiandra leaving Circular Quay with Barrenjoey (later North Head) behind, 1920s

== Kubu ==
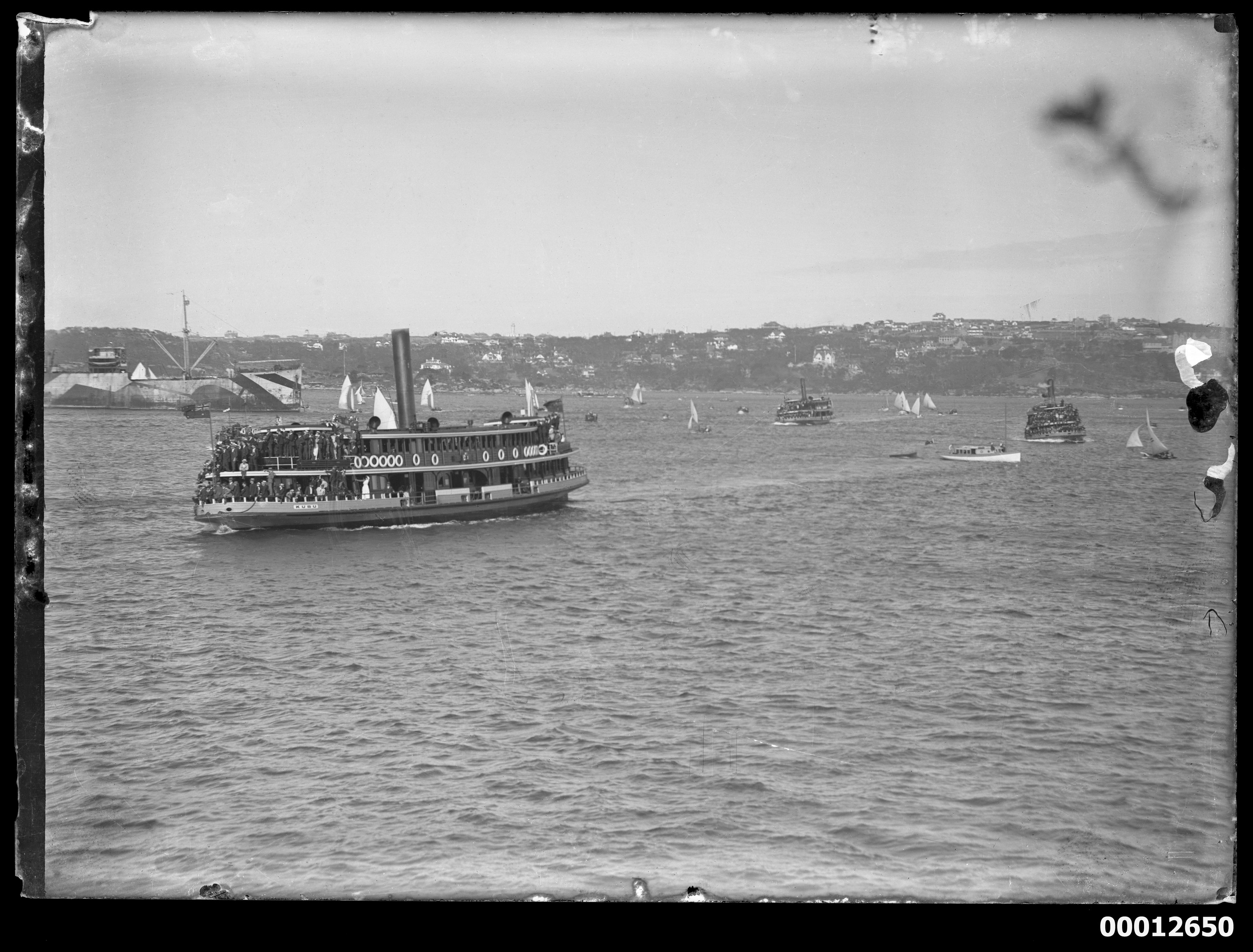
Kubu on a spectator excursion

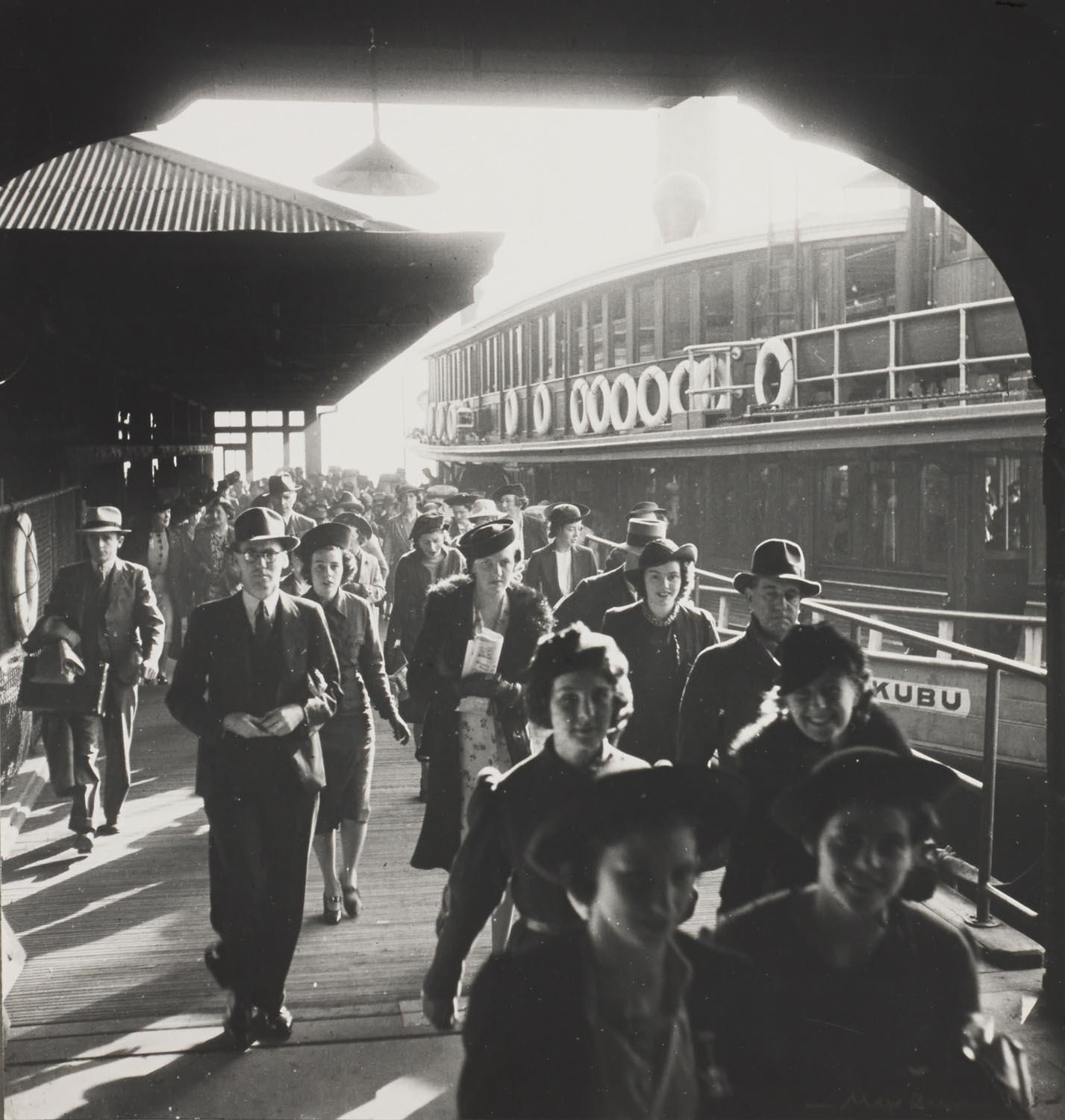
Max Dupain photograph of passengers alighting Kubu at Circular Quay, 1938

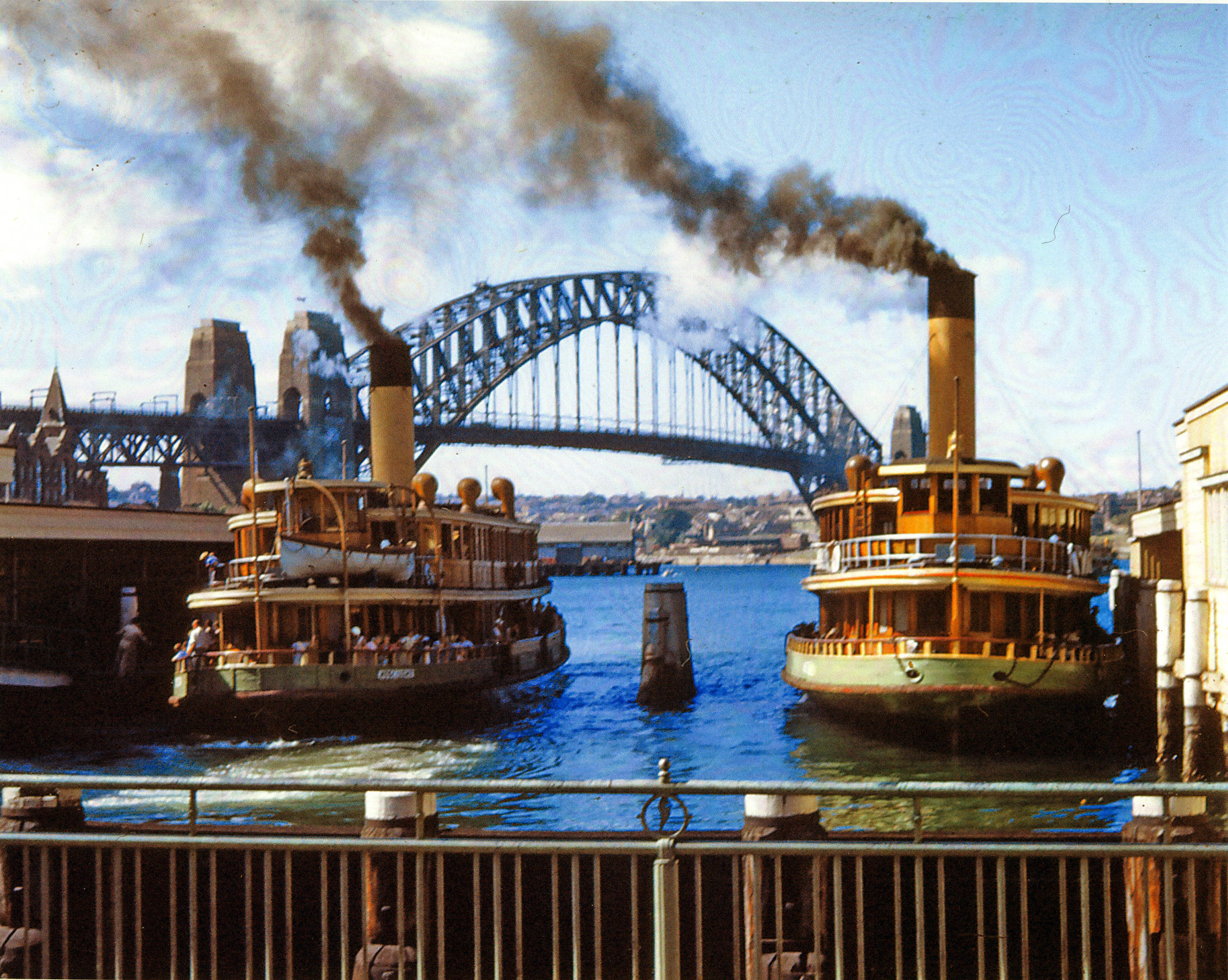
Kosciusko (left) and Kubu (right) in Circular Quay 1956 in the cream and green.

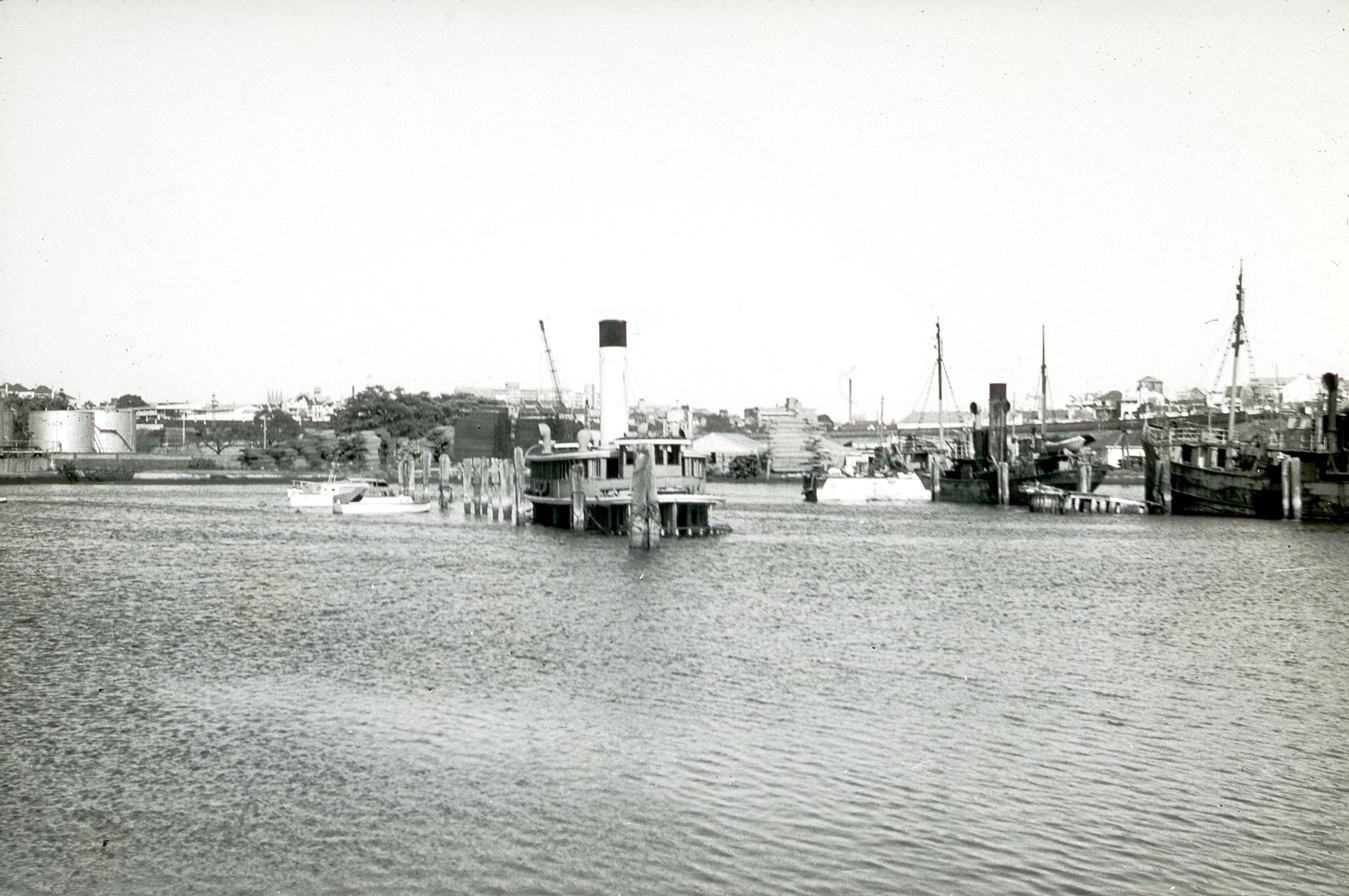
Kubu sunk while laid up, Blackwattle Bay 1964

== See also ==
- List of Sydney Harbour ferries
- Timeline of Sydney Harbour ferries
- Sydney K-class ferries
