= MV North Head =

Australian ferry

Coordinates: 16.953601°S 145.797374°E

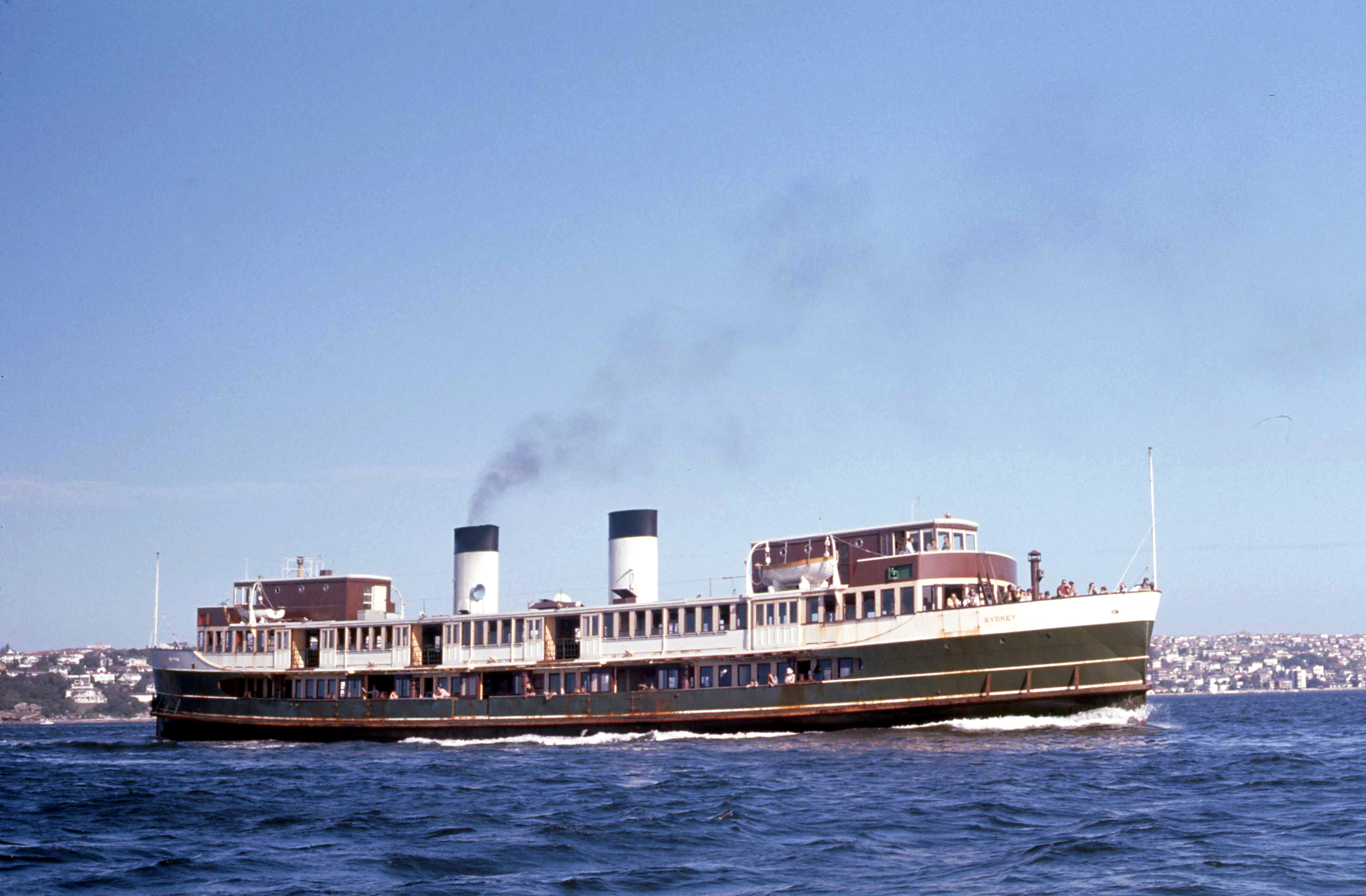
- as North Head on Sydney Harbour, 1972

History
- Name: MV North Head; formerly SS Barrenjoey
- Namesake: North Head; Barrenjoey
- Operator: Port Jackson & Manly Steamship Company; Public Transport Commission; Urban Transit Authority
- Port of registry: Sydney
- Route: Manly
- Builder: Mort's Dock
- Cost: £32,000
- Yard number: 39
- Launched: 8 May 1913
- In service: 20 September 1913
- Out of service: 12 December 1985
- Identification: IMO number: 5256939

General characteristics
- Tonnage: 499 GRT
- Decks: 2
- Capacity: 1,262

MV North Head (formerly SS Barrenjoey) was a ferry operated by the Port Jackson & Manly Steamship Company and its successors on the Manly service from 1913 until 1985.

The vessel was launched as Barrenjoey, a steamer and one of the six Binngarra-type Manly ferries which were built between 1905 and 1922. In 1951, she was converted to diesel-electric power, completely rebuilt and renamed North Head. She was removed from service in 1985 following the introduction of the Freshwater-class ferries. She spent time in Hobart as a floating restaurant and, in 2000, she was taken to Cairns where she remains grounded and in deteriorating condition.

The name "Barrenjoey" was taken from the headland at the northern tip of Pittwater. "North Head" is the northern headland at the entrance to Sydney Harbour.

== Background ==
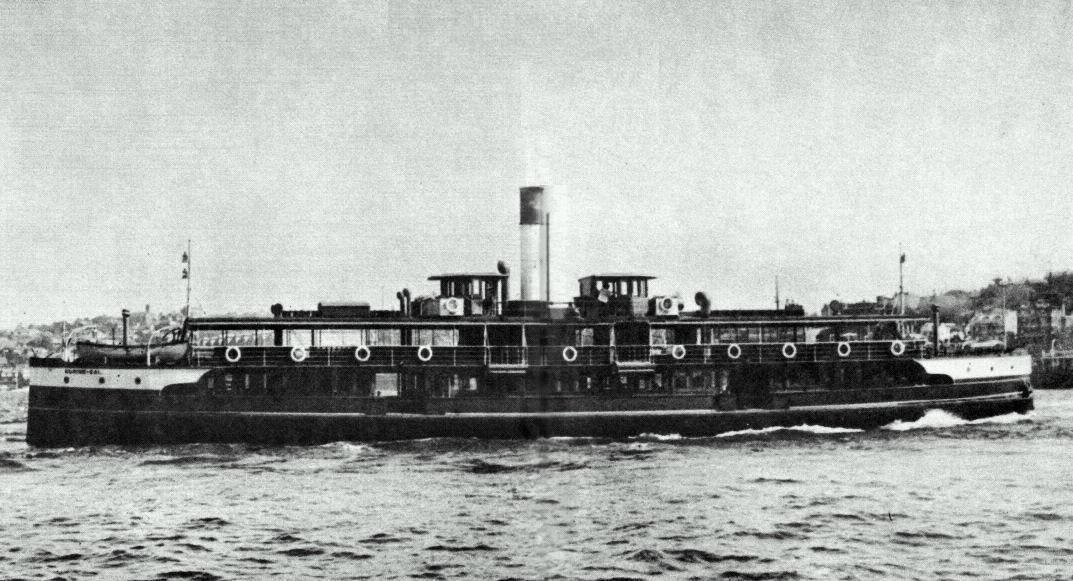
Kuring-gai (1901) was the forerunner to the Binngarra-type vessels including Barrenjoey. Note the wheel houses located midships compared to Barrenjoey's at the ends of the sun deck.

The Port Jackson & Manly Steamship Company's fleet transitioned comparatively late to screw propelled vessels and the fleet comprised mostly paddle steamers until the early years of the twentieth century. The difficulty of turning in the narrow bays of Sydney Harbour—particularly in the busy Circular Quay terminus in Sydney Cove—required the use of double-ended vessels. However, a double-ended screw configuration was particularly difficult for the fine bows that Manly ferries required for both speed and heavy seas. Further, a propeller at the leading forward end of a vessel reduced speed considerably. In the prosperous early twentieth century, this speed drawback was overcome by increasing engine size and power.

The first screw ferries on the Manly run were two innovative Walter Reeks-designed vessels; the SS Manly (1896) and SS Kuring-gai (1901), which were to become the fore-runners of the Binngarra-class ferries. They both had high forecastles at either to help her run through the deep-sea conditions across the Sydney Heads. The steel-hulled Kuring-gai was larger and she further refined the basic design to be similar to the subsequent and larger Binngarra-class vessels. Manly and Kuring-gai had both, however, followed paddle steamer design with their bridges around the midships funnels. Whereas the Binngarra-class vessels would have their wheelhouses at either end of their promenade decks.

The Binngarra-class ferries, Binngarra (1905), Burra-Bra (1908), Bellubera (1910), Balgowlah (1912), Barrenjoey (1913) and Baragoola (1922), were designed by Mort's Dock and Engineering, initially under the guidance of former chief draughtsman Andrew Christie. The first five were built at Mort's Woolwich yard and Baragoola was built at the Balmain yard. They were among the largest ships built in Australian yards at the time and, on the admission of Mort's executives, were built by the dock more for prestige than profit. Build costs were higher in Australia than in the United Kingdom, but this was offset by the cost of sailing them out to Australia.

== Steam ship Barrenjoey ==
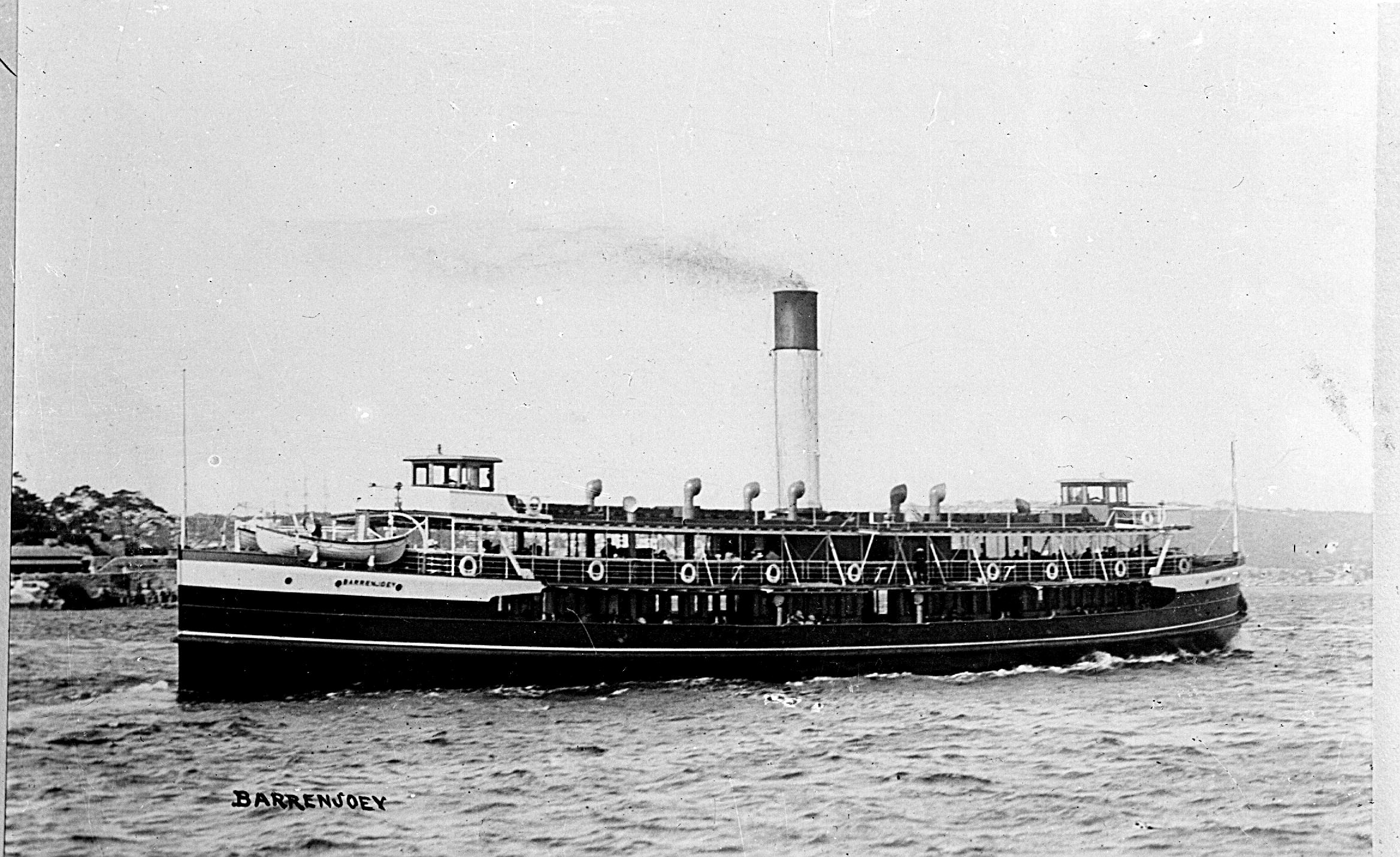
Barrenjoey on Sydney Harbour, 1920s, before expansion of her wheelhouses

Following Bellubera's success (she was bigger and faster than the preceding Binngarra and Burra-Bra), in 1911 the Company placed an order for two new vessels, Balgowlah and Barrenjoey, which were largely the same design. The three would represent the largest, fastest and most refined of the six Binngarra-class vessels. Like the previous four of the class, Barrenjoey was built by Mort's Dock at their Woolwich yard.

The three vessels all had riveted steel hulls with single screws at either end, and steam steering equipment. Barrenjoey was 500 tons, 64.0 metres (210 ft 0 in) in length and had a passenger capacity of 1,512. Her 112-horsepower triple expansion steam engines were also built by Mort's Dock could push her at up to 15 knots. The vessels had "navy-type" boilers with corrugated furnaces in both.

The ships' promenade (upper) decks were entirely open except for two small shelters and the canopy formed by the sun deck. All of the Binngarra class would later have their upper decks enclosed except the first two, Binngarra and Burra Bra. The main (lower) decks were enclosed and had outside perimeter seating. The two decks were connected by two double internal staircases. The ladies' cabin was located at the aft end of the main deck, while the crew spaces were placed on a flat forward of the boiler room. Electric lighting was fitted throughout.

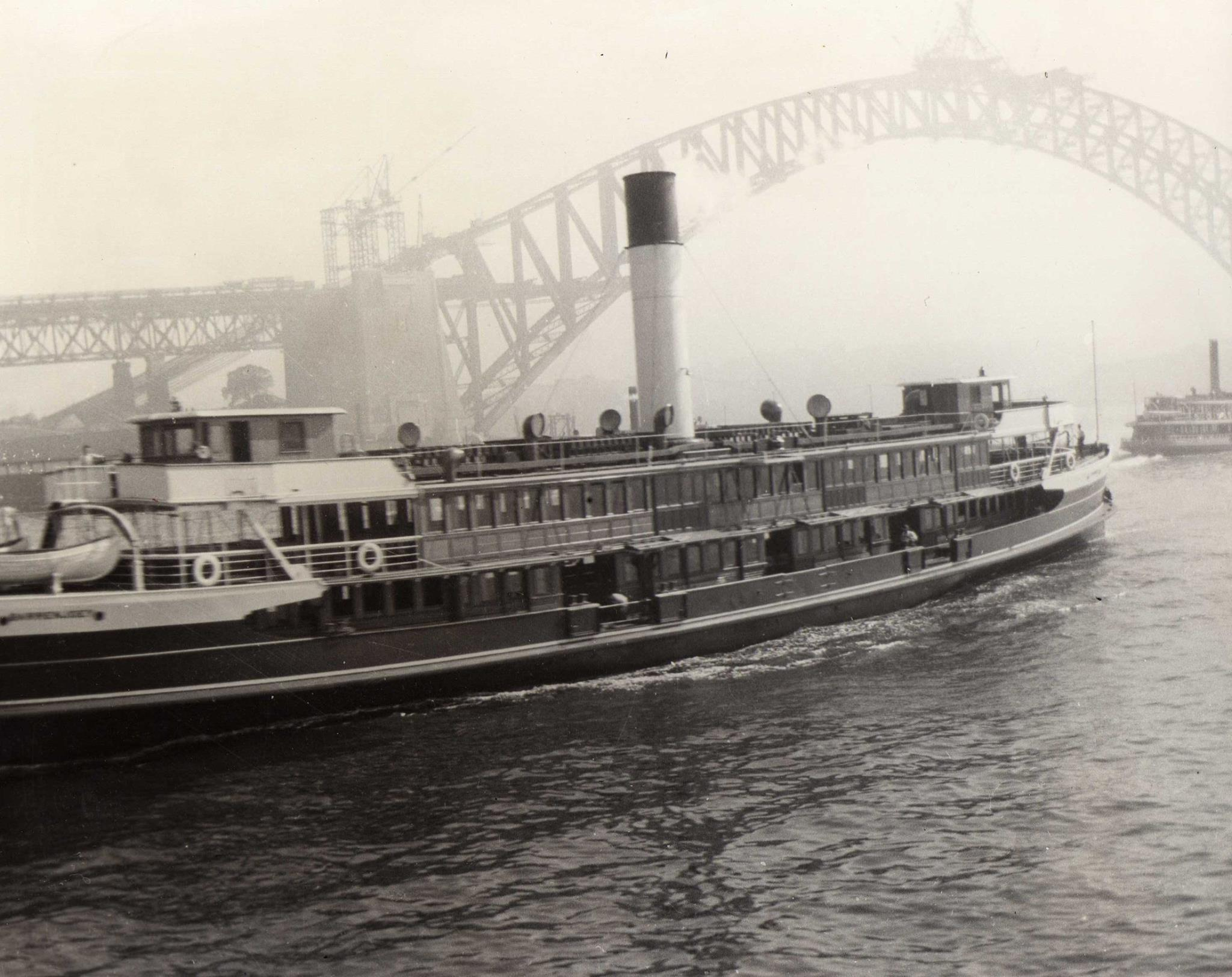
Approaching Circular Quay in her recently enclosed upper decks, 1931

Barrenjoey was launched on 8 May 1913 by the daughter of Mr. B. McBride (a director of the Port Jackson Company). The name "Barrenjoey" was taken from the headland at the northern tip of Pittwater. Her sea trials were run on 17 September 1913 from near Long Nose Point to the Sow and Pigs and back. A newspaper report said that she exceeded the speed stipulated in the contract by one knot. Following the trials, guests of the company were entertained at a luncheon held on board with her moored off Cremorne Point. The chairman noted that since the paddle steamer Narrabeen (1886), the combined value of new steamers delivered by Mort's Dock for the company was £170,000. In 1901, the fleet comprised five steamers with a combined capacity of 4,300 passengers. Twelve years later with Barrenjoey's introduction, there were eight vessels with a combined capacity of 10,500. The new steamer was placed in service on 20 September 1913, at which time the company's capacity was sufficient and Baragoola wasn't delivered until 1922.

The cost and difficulty of replacing the large steel-hulled Manly ferries saw them upgraded and modified rather than replaced. In line with regulations requiring improved crew accommodation, facilities were progressively removed from the poorly ventilated spaces below the main deck. In the 1920s, Barrenjoey along with Bellubera, Balgowlah and Baragoola had officers' cabins attached to their wheelhouses. In the 1940s additional cabins were added to the wheelhouses for the entire crews, which affected the vessels' stability and resulted in reduced passenger capacities from the 1950s. Also in the 1920s, Barrenjoey and the rest of the Binngarra-class ferries were fitted with small cafeterias below the main deck aft, but the cafeterias were removed from the vessels in the 1930s.

In August 1930, Barrenjoey had much of her open upper deck enclosed with reversible and upholstered seating provided, making the vessels more suitable for the heavy business traffic, and was of benefit to the travelling public during the colder months and at night. Balgowlah, Bellubera and Baragoola also received enclosed upper decks between 1931 and 1932; however, the older Binngarra and Burra-Bra did not receive the upgrade. Curl Curl and Dee Why (both 1928) had been built with the enclosed upper saloon.

== Motor vessel North Head ==
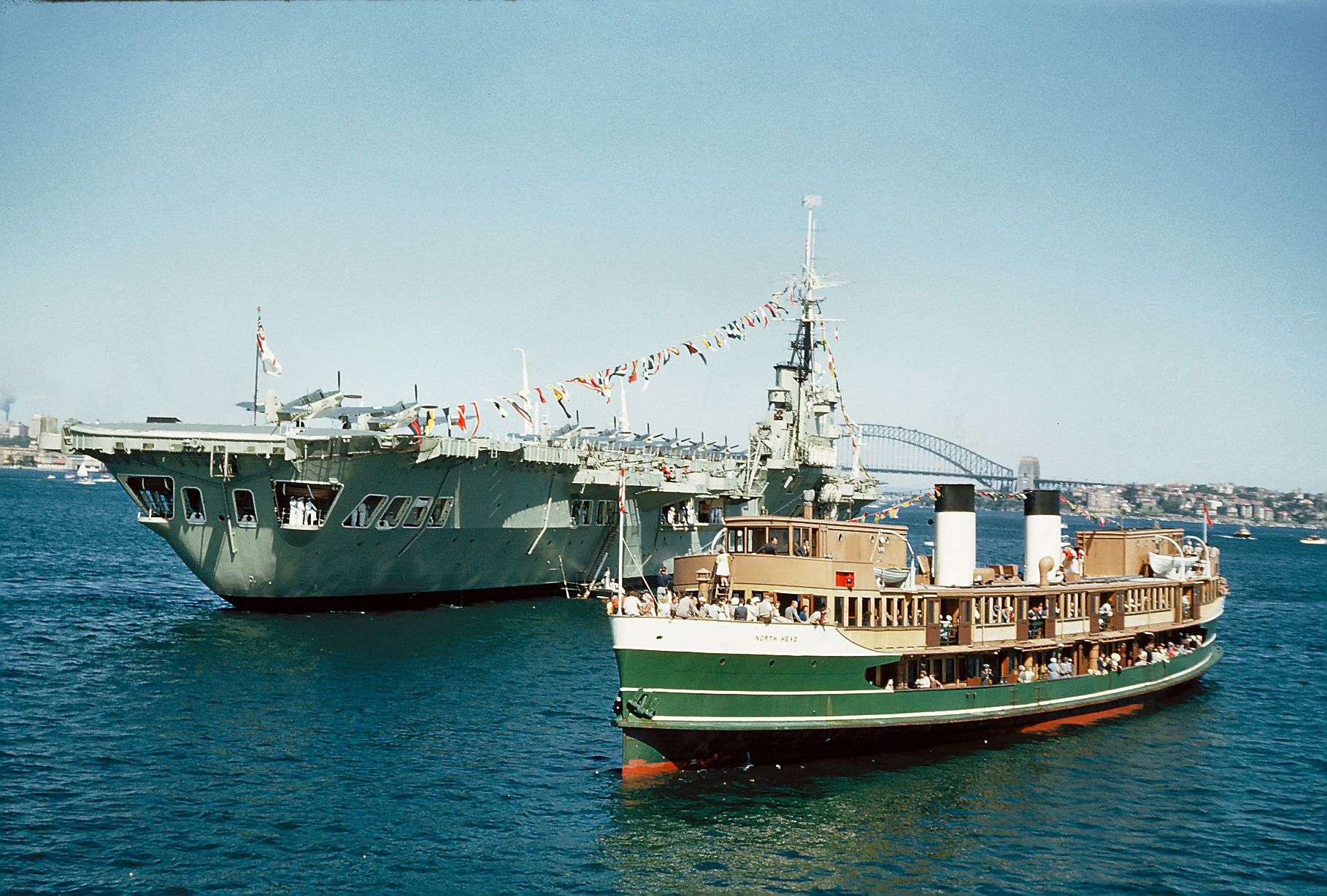
Newly rebuilt as North Head and alongside HMAS Vengeance as part of Queen Elizabeth II's first visit to Australia, 1954

In 1946, the company decided to convert Balgowlah and Barrenjoey from steam to diesel-electric propulsion, as the cost of replacing the two vessels with new boats was by then prohibitive to the company. Barrenjoey's last trip as a steamer was on 12 April 1948, when she was withdrawn from service for a survey, which subsequently failed her boilers. By 30 June 1949, the ferry's original builder, Mort's Dock and Engineering, had fitted new hull plates, altered the hull framing and provided foundation beds for the new equipment. Post-war shortages of labour and materials prolonged the work and increased costs to £261,772 which almost bankrupted the company.

Four seven-cylinder British Thomson-Houston diesel engines were provided which drove two English Electric electric engines. Her new engines generated 2,000 bhp and could push her to 16 knots. Her tall single-steam funnel was replaced with two short funnels. Her formerly timber superstructure was completely rebuilt with a fully enclosed steel upper deck, wheelhouses further extended, and bows rebuilt to resemble the South Steyne's (1938). With the exception of the outside seating on the main deck, all seating was enclosed and upholstered. The camber on the upper deck was removed, and with the transverse seating being removable, it was possible to hold dances on board while limited catering facilities were provided.

The vessel's new gross and net tonnages was 465.66 and 183.78, respectively. She was permitted to carry 904 on the main deck and 358 persons on the promenade deck with a total seated capacity of 1,005. The rebuild also provided a raked bow and stern in place of the former straight stems. Following sea trials on the 5 May 1951, she was commissioned on 7 May 1951 having been renamed North Head. The vessel's stability had been affected by the new heavier steel superstructure and larger wheelhouses. Life rafts were moved from the sun deck to the fore and aft ends of the promenade deck and sections of the bulwarks were hinged to allow the wooden rafts to be pushed overboard.

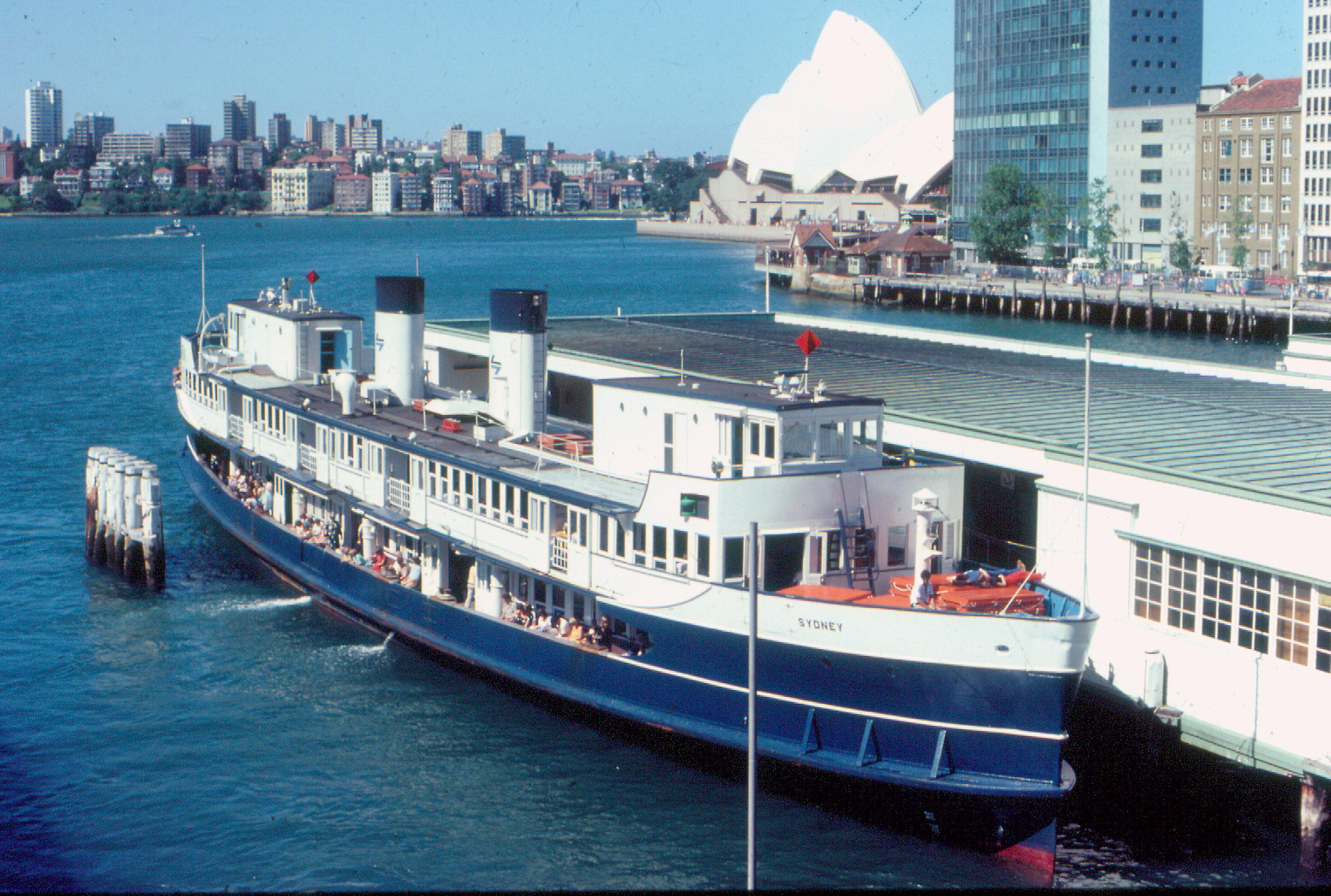
North Head at Circular Quay in her Urban Transit Authority colours, 1981

The last four Binngarra-class ferries (Balgowlah, Bellubera, Barrenjoey and Baragoola) were all to be modernised and converted to diesel-electric propulsion. However, the company's post-war economic difficulties and the cost of the Barrenjoey's rebuild and diesel conversion almost bankrupted the company. As such, Balgowlah was decommissioned and sold to ship breakers in 1953 and the engines acquired for her went to Baragoola. Upgrades to Bellubera and Baragoola in future years were much more modest in scope retaining their original hull shape and timber superstructures. Bellubera was withdrawn from service in 1973.

In 1964, it was sent to Melbourne under her own power for the Moomba Festival for six weeks. It returned to Melbourne in 1965 and 1967. North Head and Baragoola were included in the sale of the Manly ferry business to Brambles in April 1972 (South Steyne was not). With Brambles having allowed the ferries' condition and service to deteriorate while suggesting that the service would be closed completely, the Public Transport Commission took over the service in December 1974 acquiring North Head and Baragoola. With the arrive of the first two Freshwater-class ferries in 1982 and 1983, Baragoola was retired. In 1984, a third new ferry, Narrabeen, arrived and with the new ferries having settled down, North Head was withdrawn on 12 December 1985, 72 years after entering service.

On 26 March 1987, North Head departed under its own steam for Hobart for use as a floating restaurant and convention centre. She underwent significant restoration; however, the venture failed. In 2000, it was sold and moved to Cairns to be used in the same manner. However, after the venture failed, the ship rotted in a Cairns dock until 2005, when it was sold on eBay to a landscape contractor, who dug a pit and put it in his front yard.

== Incidents ==
Over her 73 years as a Sydney Harbour ferry, Barrenjoey/North Head had her fair share of largely minor collisions and other incidents:

- Within a year of her commissioning, Barrenjoey was lost in thick fog and drifted around Manly Cove for two-and-a-half hours before finding the wharf around 1:30 a.m.
- Barrenjoey collided with Kareela in 1914, Kirawa also in 1914 and Kiandra in 1927. Collisions with the timber inner-harbour ferries usually resulted in significant damage to the timber boats, but insignificant damage to the steel Manly ferries.
- In January 1940, she collided with Kubu as both ferries tried to avoid yachts. Timber Kubu's upper deck and railings were badly damaged, whereas steel-hulled Barrenjoey was only scratched.
- In January 1942, Barrenjoey went aground on rocks at Smedleys Point near Manly wharf. She was stuck for an hour before freeing herself and continuing on with her normal trip with no damage.
- During a cyclone that hit Sydney on 16 April 1946, passengers on Barrenjoey and Baragoola were injured and both ferries damaged. Later that day in the same storm, Barrenjoey was torn free of her mooring at the Kurraba Point base and drifted across the harbour towards a group of navy ships, but then jammed crosswise into the Neutral Bay ferry wharf. A tug was used to pull her free.
- On the night 28 May 1955, North Head ran aground off Bradleys Head in thick fog. It was two-and-a-half hours before she was pulled off, by which time the fog was so thick, all harbour traffic had been halted.
- In 1976, a fire broke out in North Head's wiring. It was put out and she returned to the Balmain base where it was replaced and she went back into service the next day.
- In 1979, North Head failed to stop at Circular Quay and rammed the seawall and footpath. Damage was found to be slight, however, with only Baragoola and the small Lady Wakehurst available; peak hour was chaos.
- In July 1979, she lost a rudder near Bradleys Head which caused chaos on the morning run for the 31st. With only one rudder until a new one could be made, she was used sparingly in peak hour. Baragoola and the smaller Lady Wakehurst had to carry the majority of the service as the small Lady Northcott was not available due to a refit.
- On 5 November 1984, during a Sydney-record rain event, North Head and Kanangra collided off the Sydney Opera House. North Head had turned too early and the collision with Kanangra prevented her running into the Sydney Opera House. The smaller Kanangra had significant damage but there was no apparent significant damage to North Head. Two weeks later, however, she broke down and was found to have a broken propeller shaft, likely damaged in the accident with Kanangra.

== SS Barrenjoey ==
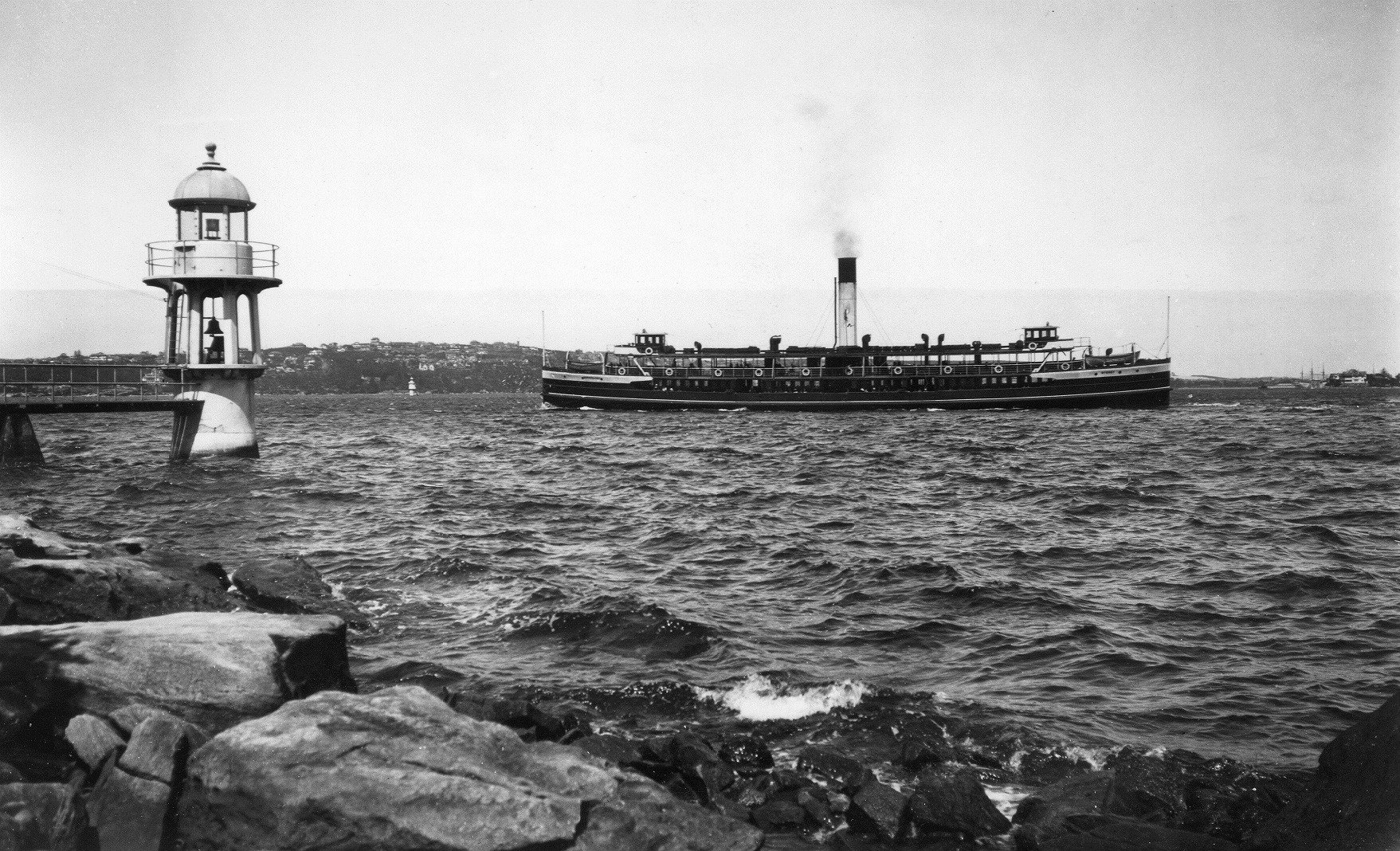
Rounding Bradleys Head in her as built form with original wheelhouses and open upper decks

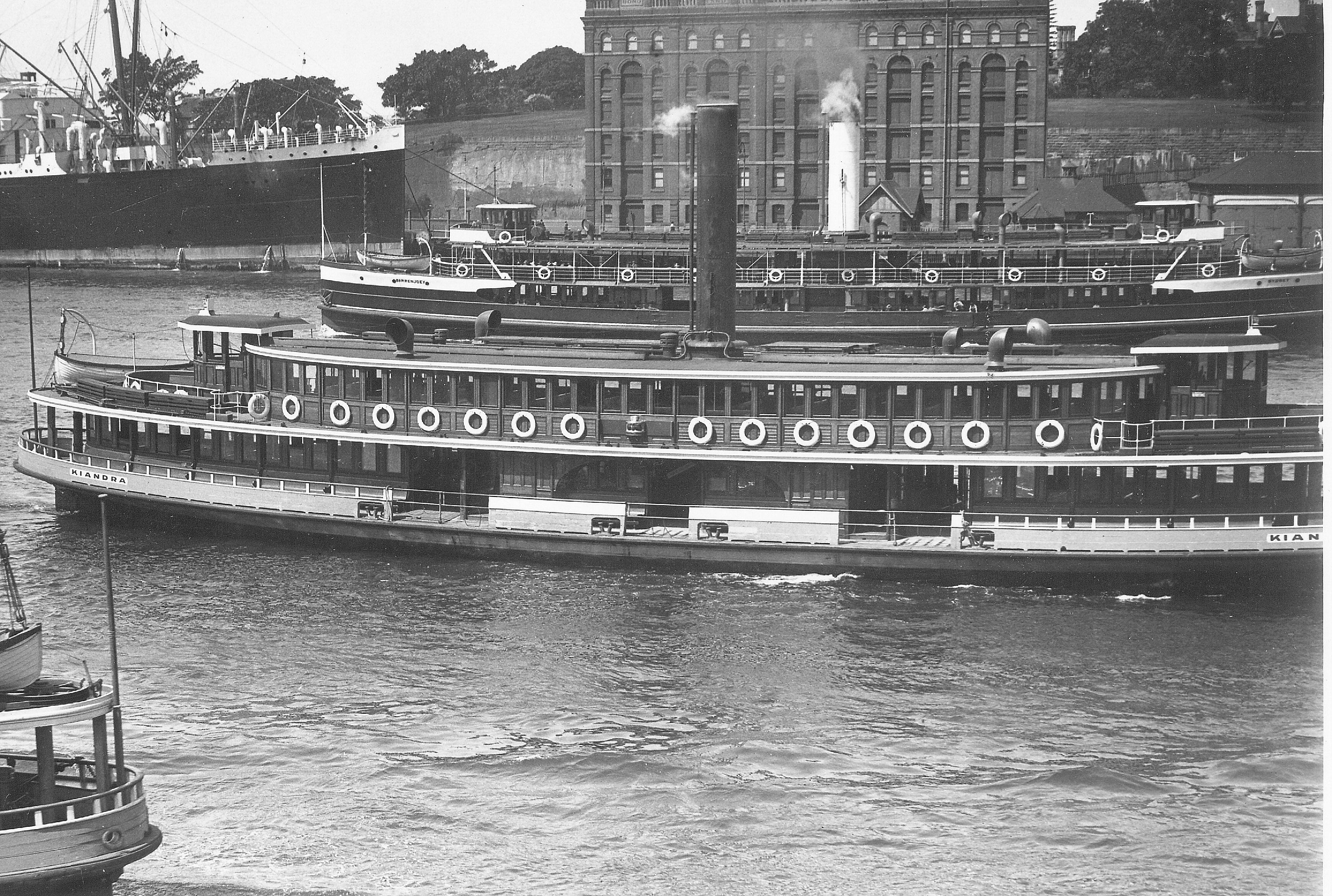
In Circular Quay behind ferry Kiandra, 1920s

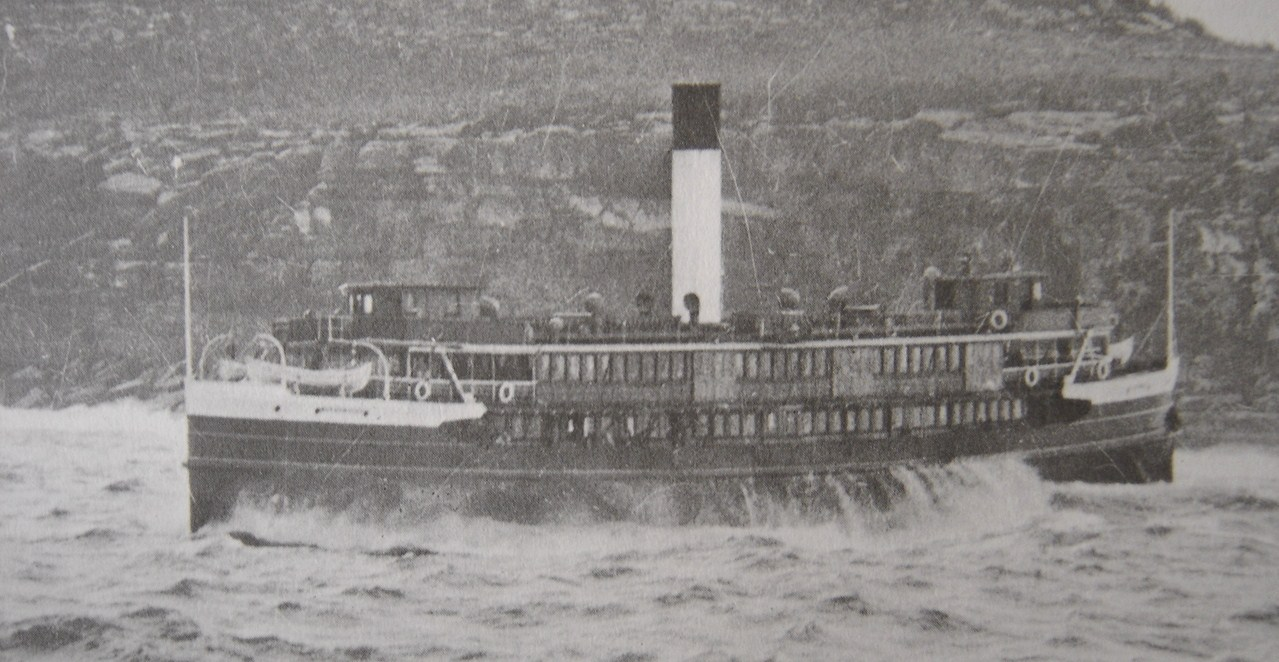
Crossing Sydney Heads with extended wheelhouses and enclosed upper decks, 1930s or early 1940s

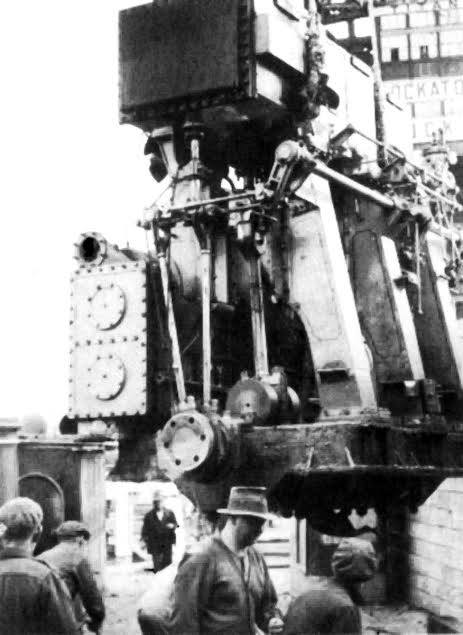
Removal of steam engines during conversion to diesel-electric propulsion

== MV North Head ==
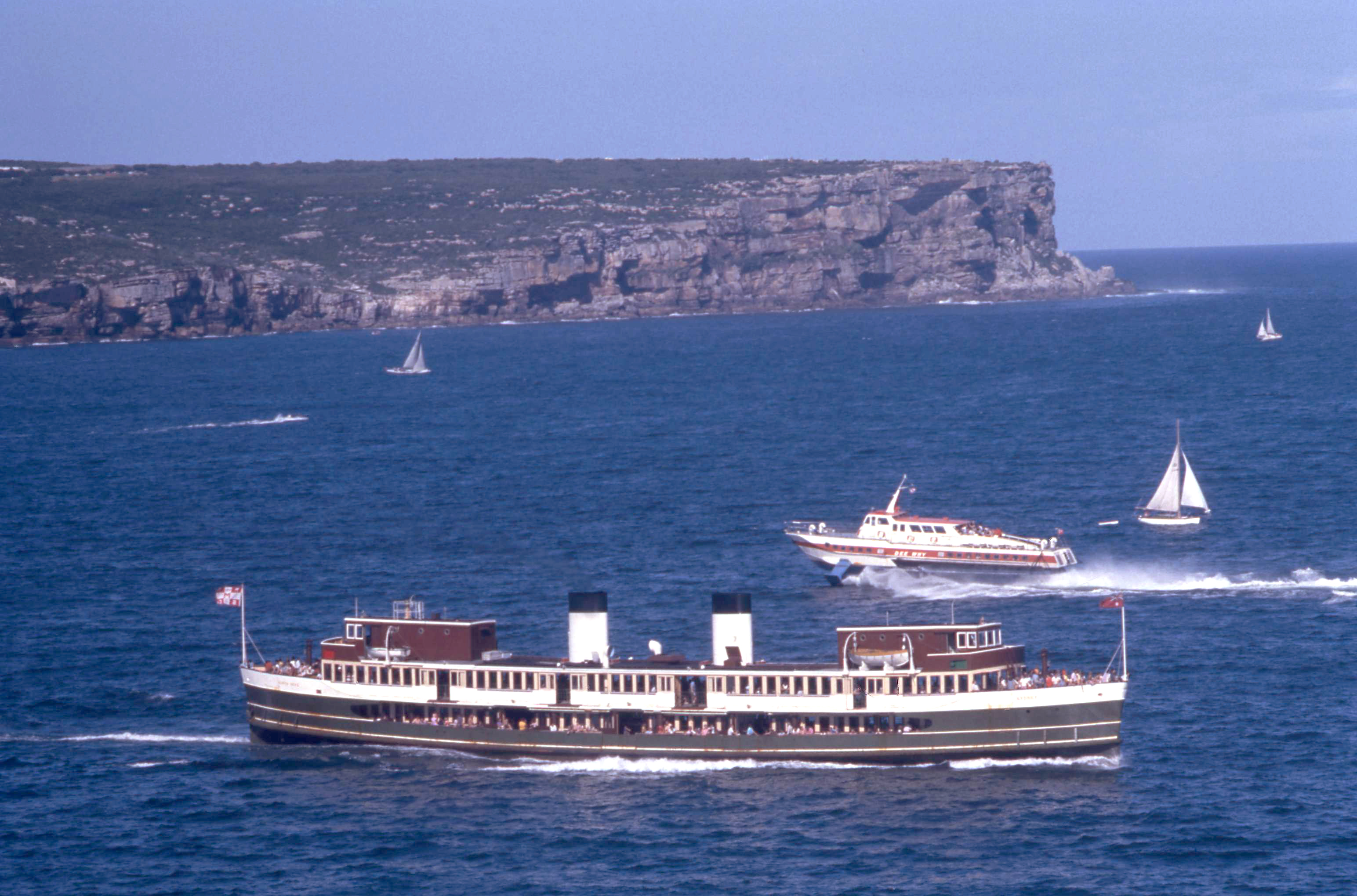
As a Brambles Limited ferry, passing hydrofoil Dee Why. Her namesake, North Head, is in the background.

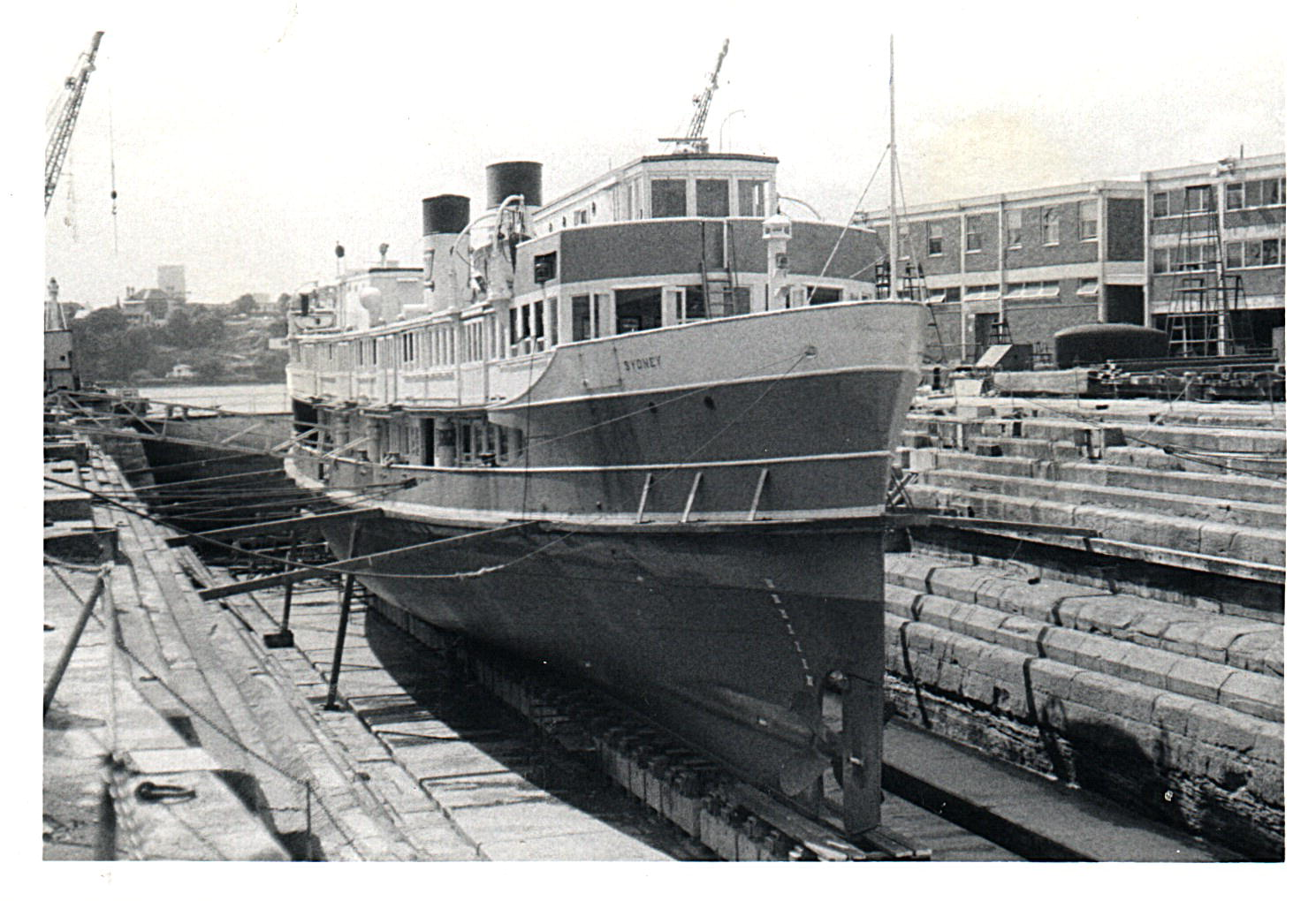
In Cockatoo dock for maintenance, 1975

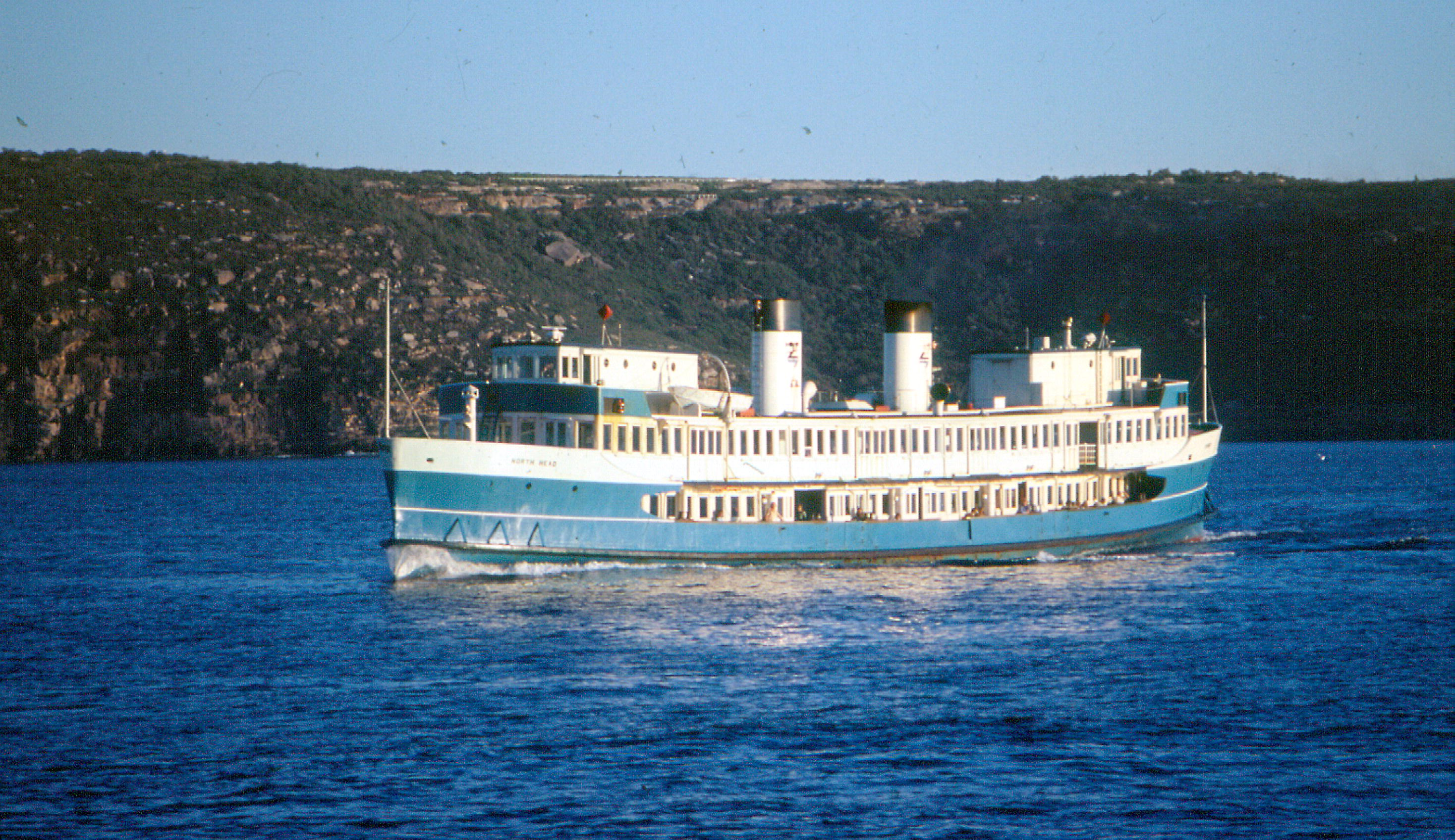
In Public Transport Commission colours passing Dobroyd Head en route to Circular Quay, 1980

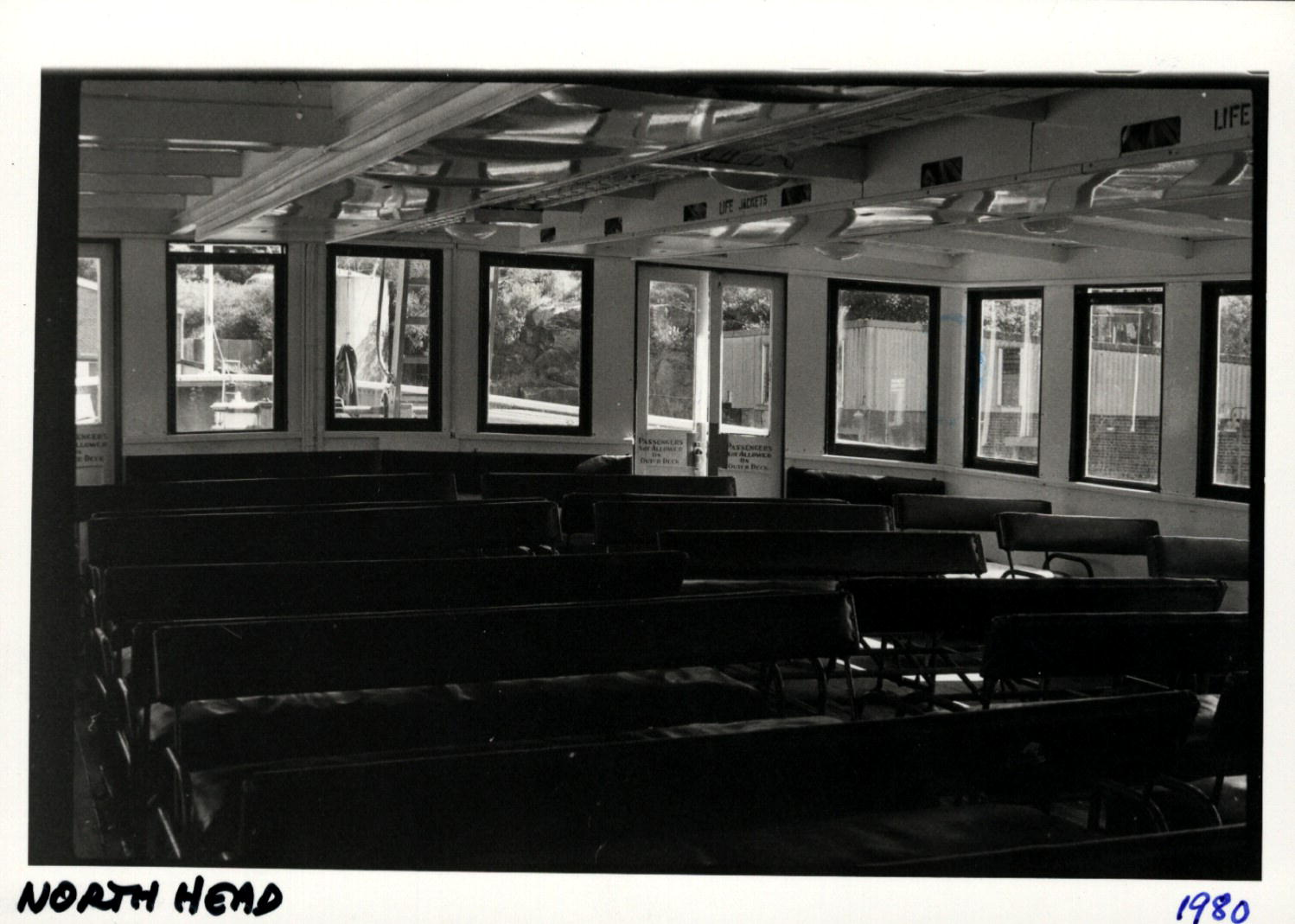
Interior upper deck, 1980

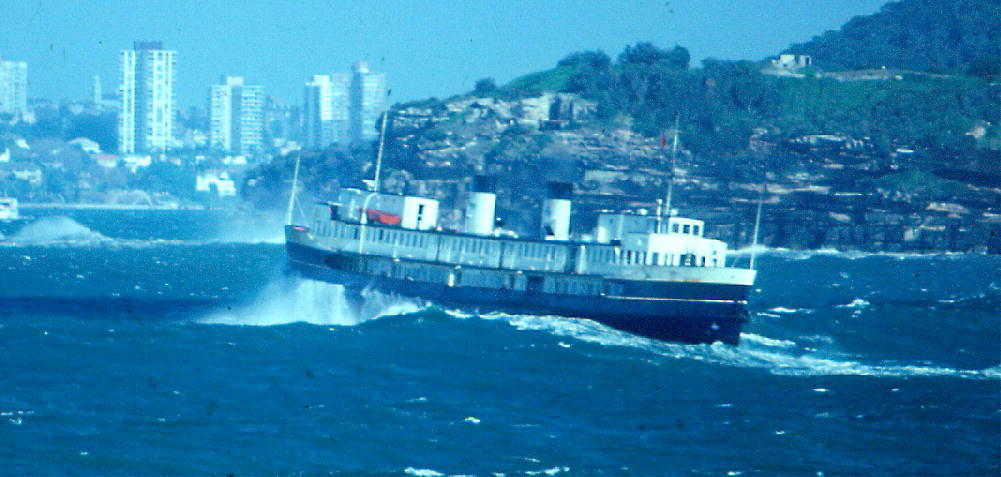
Crossing the Sydney Heads in Urban Transit Authority colours, showing masts added after her final refit. Middle Head in the background, 1984

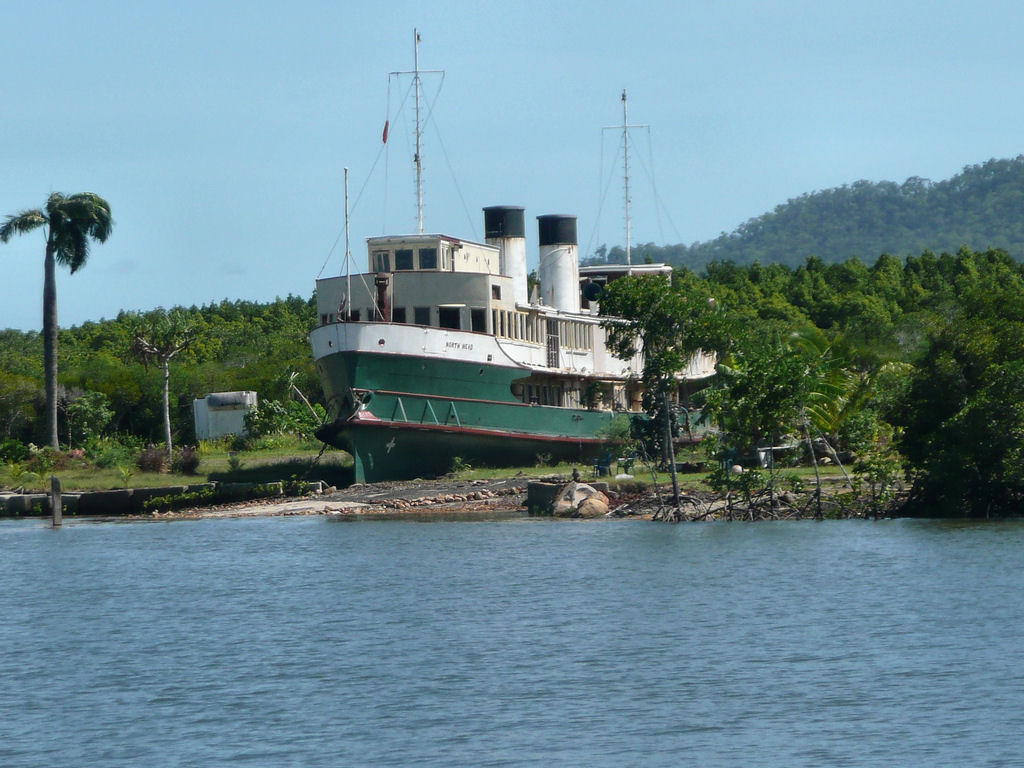
Aground and land-locked at Trinity Inlet near Cairns, 2009

== See also ==
- List of Sydney Harbour ferries
- Timeline of Sydney Harbour ferries
