= Barrenjoey, New South Wales =

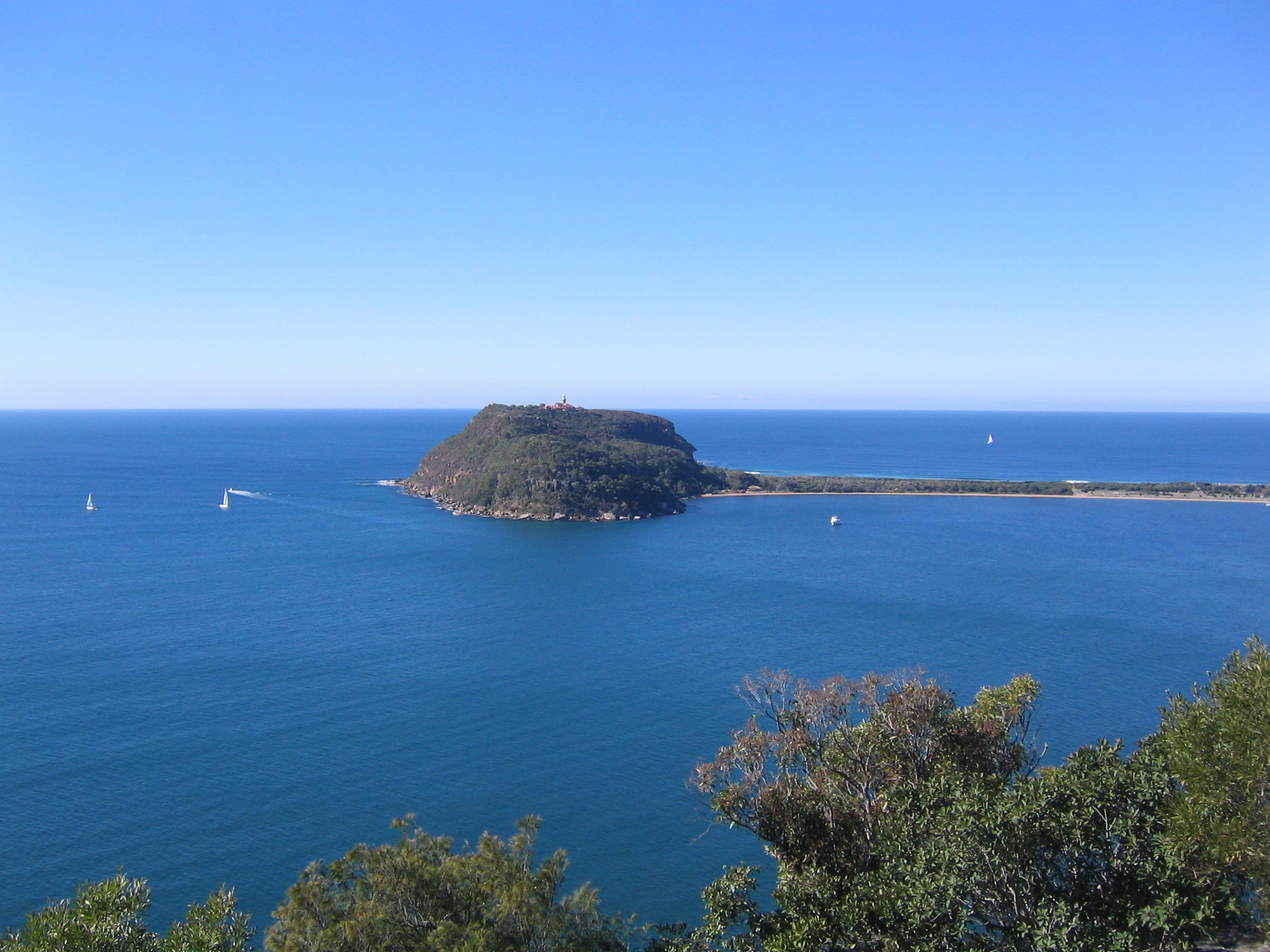
Barrenjoey Headland and Station Beach viewed from West Head

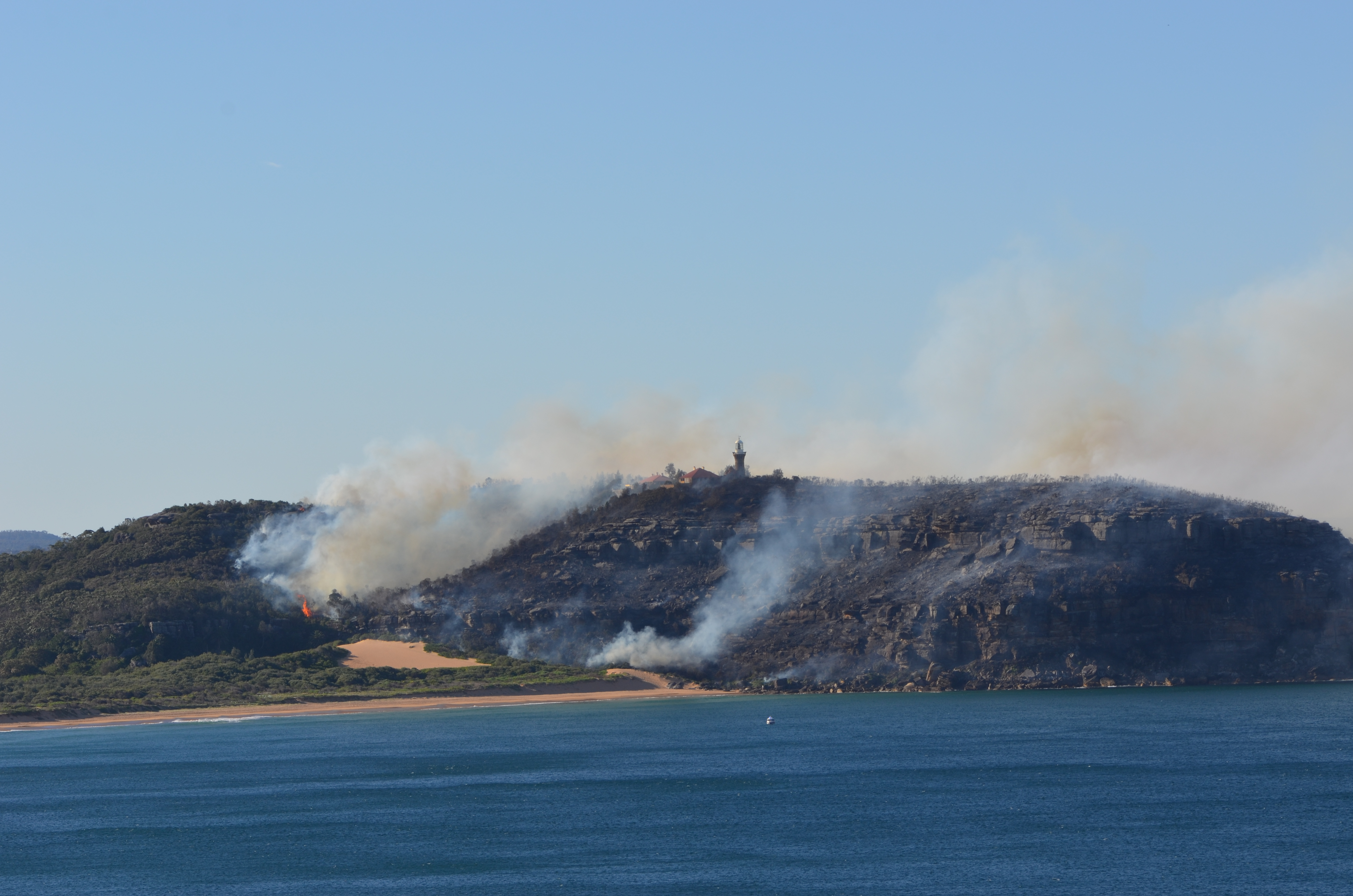
Barrenjoey Headland bushfire, 28 September 2013, viewed from the sea

Barrenjoey or Barrenjoey Head is a headland and geographical locality within the suburb of Palm Beach, located at the northernmost point of the Barrenjoey Peninsula in Sydney, Australia. Facing Broken Bay to the north and flanked by Pittwater and the Tasman Sea, the headland is composed primarily of sandstones of the Newport Formation, the top third a cap of Hawkesbury sandstone. Around 10,000 years ago the headland was cut off from the mainland due to the rising sea level; subsequent buildup of a sand spit or tombolo reconnected the island to the mainland (a 'tied island'). It is the location of the Barrenjoey Head Lighthouse, a lighthouse that was first lit in 1881. In 1995 Barrenjoey was gazetted into Ku-ring-gai Chase National Park.

== History ==
On 2 March 1788, Arthur Phillip named the headland "Barrenjuee" (meaning little kangaroo or wallaby). The name changed its spelling over time, Barrenjoey now being the accepted name since 1966.

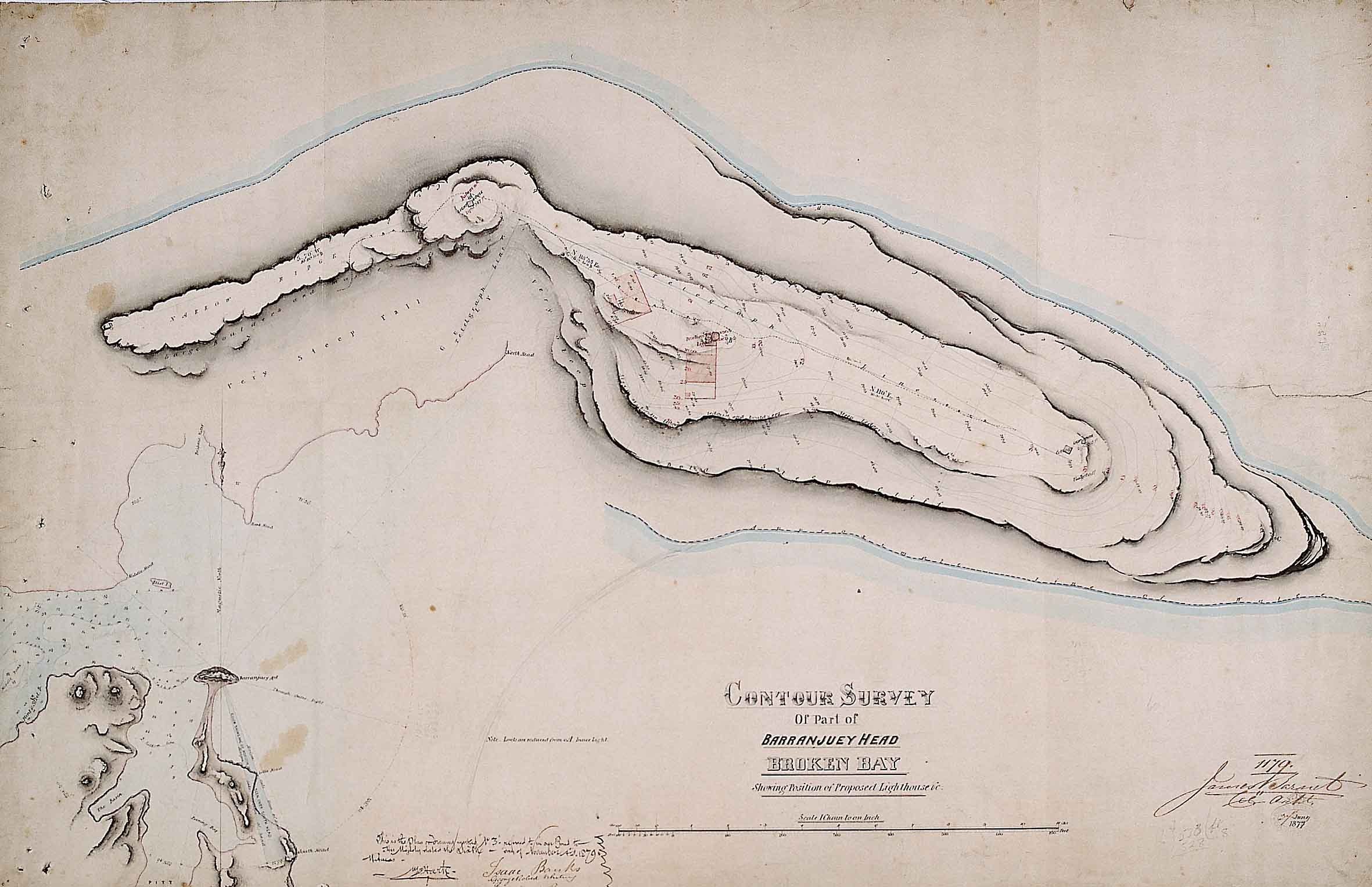
Contour survey of part of Barrenjoey Head, Broken Bay – showing position of proposed lighthouse, 1877

Since the 1980s it has been featured heavily in the soap opera Home and Away, during both the credits and the show itself.

== Ecological communities ==
Mapping by the NSW Office of Environment and Heritage in 2013 shows Barrenjoey headland containing tiny pockets of Coastal escarpment littoral rainforest, a particular subgroup of the Littoral Rainforest community, which is an endangered ecological community, together with the communities: Coastal Headland Clay Heath, Coastal Sand Tea-tree-Banksia Scrub (on the coastal fore-dune), Central Coast Escarpment Moist Forest, and Coastal Sandstone Foreshores Forest (on sandstone soils derived from either Hawkesbury or Narrabeen geology, and exposed to salt winds).

== See also ==
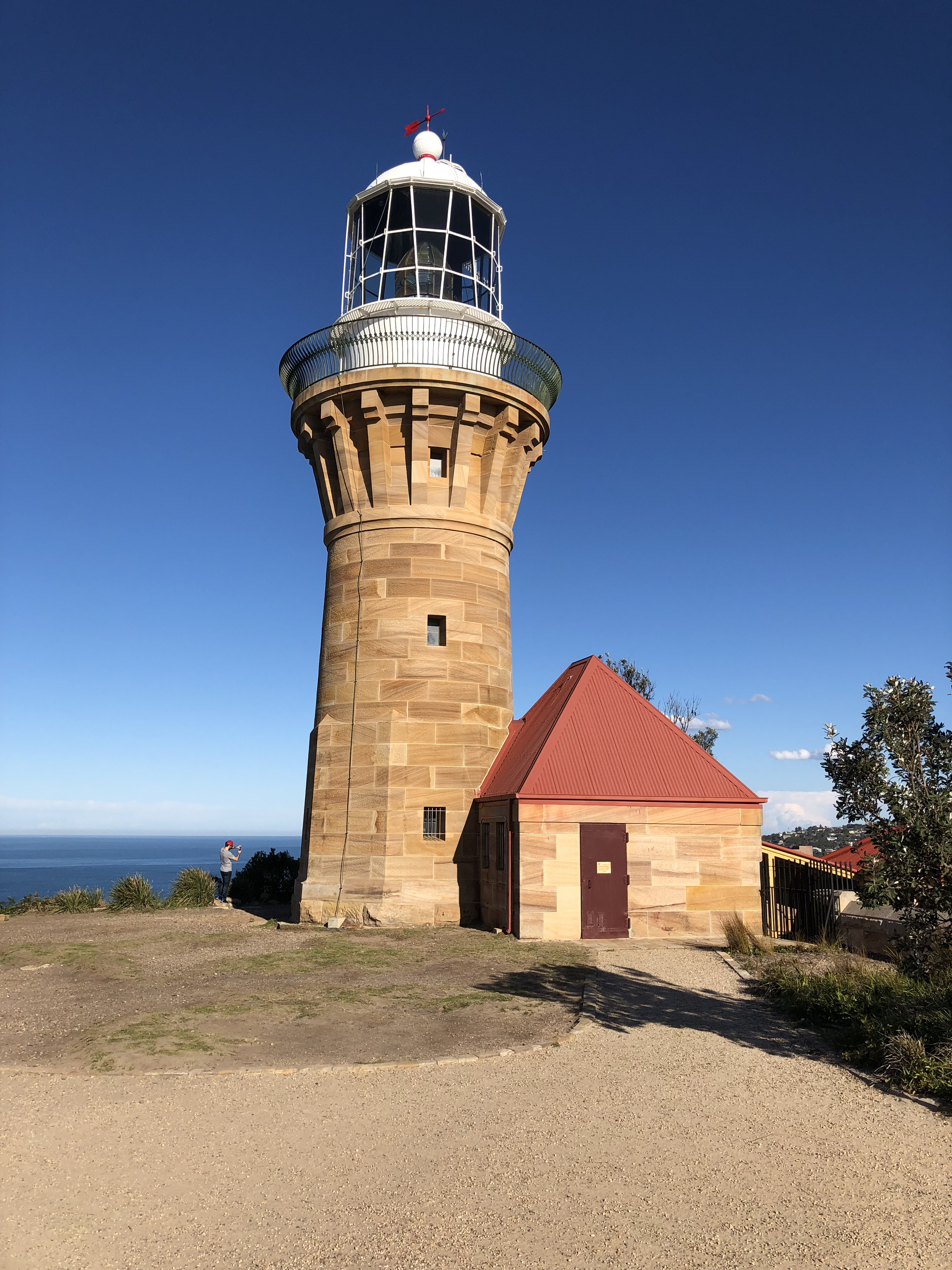
- Barrenjoey Head Lighthouse is situated on the Barrenjoey Headland –photographed 2018
  Palm Beach, New South Wales
