= Baragoola =

Australian ferry

Coordinates: 33.844695°S 151.193067°E

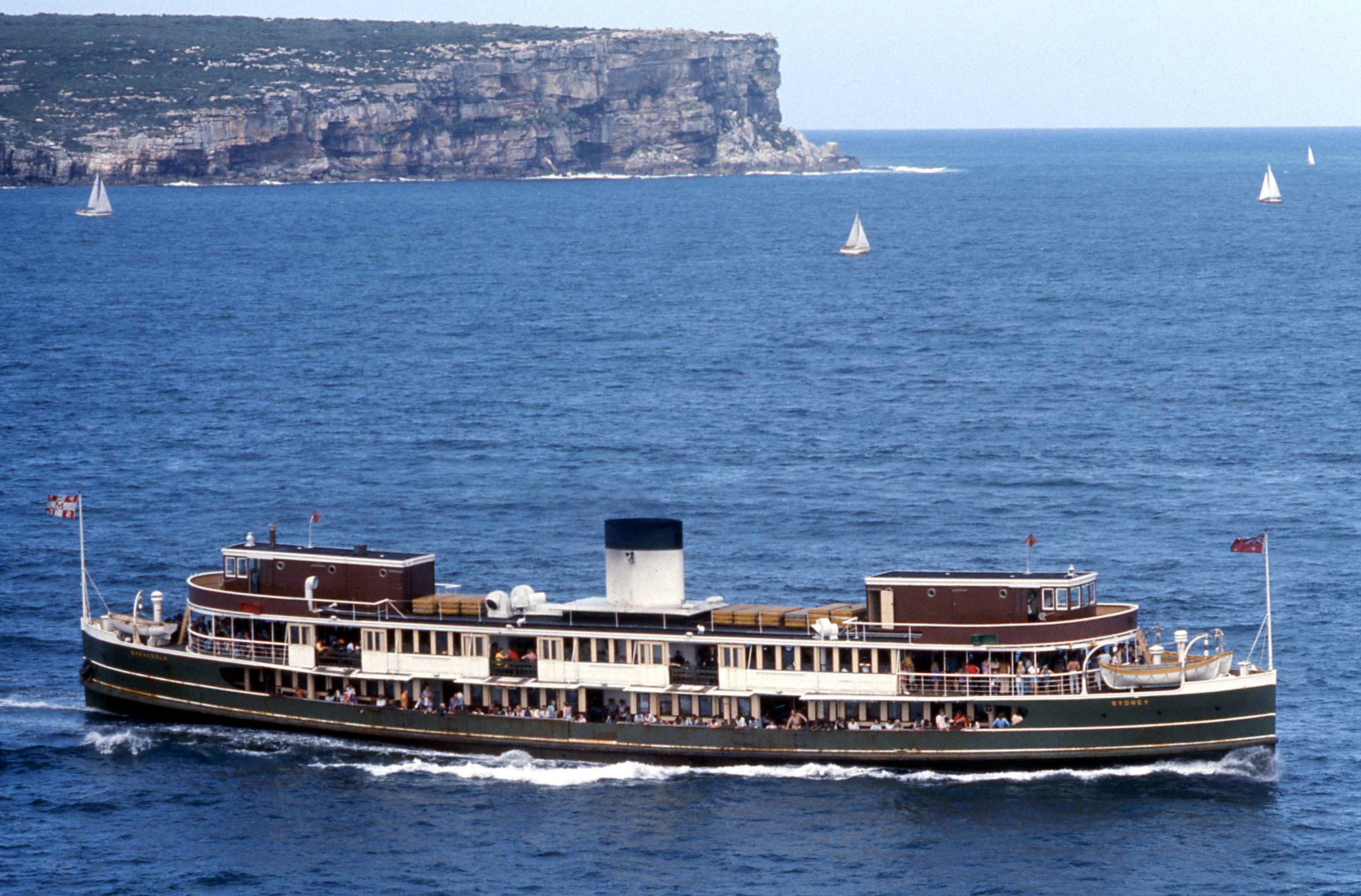
- Crossing the Sydney Heads, 1974

History

Australia
- Name: MV Baragoola; formerly SS Baragoola
- Owner: Baragoola Preservation Association Incorporated
- Operator: Port Jackson & Manly Steamship Company; Public Transport Commission; Urban Transit Authority
- Port of registry: Sydney
- Route: Manly
- Builder: Mort's Dock
- Cost: £80,000
- Yard number: 41
- Launched: 14 February 1922
- Maiden voyage: 3 September 1922
- Out of service: 8 January 1983
- Identification: IMO number: 5036145
- Fate: Sank on 1 January 2022 and scrapped

General characteristics
- Type: Ferry
- Tonnage: 498 GRT
- Length: 60.92 m (199 ft 10 in)
- Beam: 10.30 m (33 ft 10 in)
- Draught: 3.75 m (12 ft 4 in)
- Decks: 2
- Installed power: 4 × English Electric 7SKM diesels
- Speed: 16 knots (30 km/h; 18 mph)
- Capacity: 1,523 passengers
- Crew: 11 (as SS), 7 (as MV)

MV Baragoola was a ferry formerly operated by the Port Jackson & Manly Steamship Company and its successors on the Manly service.

The sixth and final of the Binngarra-type Manly ferries, the vessel entered service in 1922. Built with a triple-expansion steam engine, she was converted to diesel-electric propulsion in 1961. Since its decommissioning as a ferry in 1983, the vessel had a number of owners who attempted to find a new role and restore it. In 2003, it was laid up at Balls Head Bay on the north side of Sydney Harbour as attempts to restore the vessel continued. However, in January 2022, she sank at her mooring alongside the Balls Head Coal Loader, with the decision then made that the vessel would be scrapped.

Baragoola is an Australian Aboriginal word for "flood tide".

== Background ==
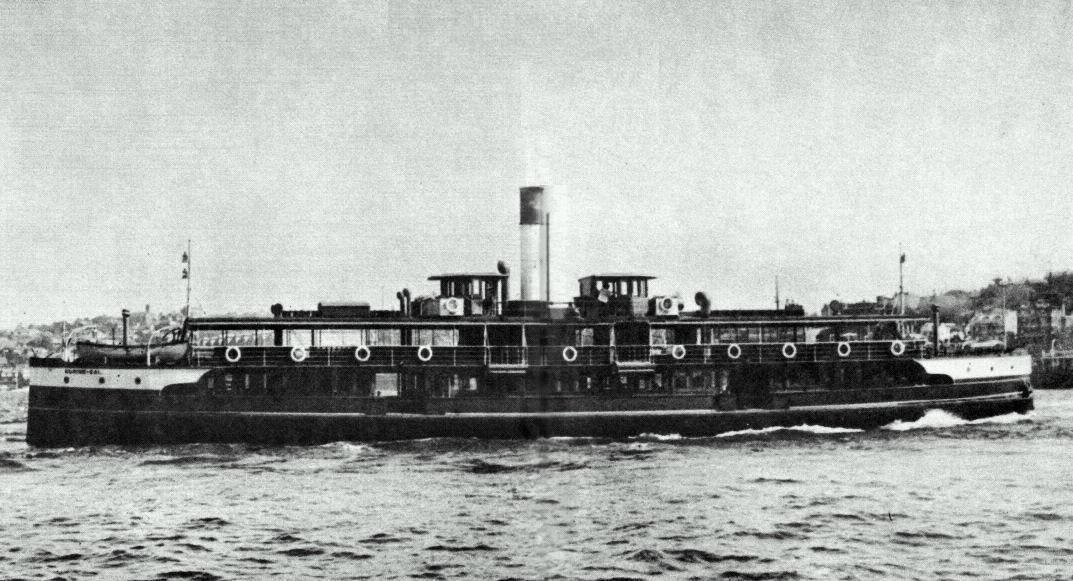
Kuring-gai (1901) was the forerunner to the "Bingarra-type" vessels including Baragoola. Note the wheel houses located midships compared to Baragoola's at the ends of the sun deck.

The Port Jackson & Manly Steamship Company's fleet transitioned comparatively late to screw-propelled vessels and the fleet comprised mostly paddle steamers until the early years of the twentieth century. The difficulty of turning in the narrow bays of Sydney Harbour - particularly in the busy Circular Quay terminus in Sydney Cove - required the use of double-ended vessels. However, a double-ended screw configuration was particularly difficult for the fine bows that Manly ferries required for both speed and heavy seas. Further, a propeller at the leading forward end of a vessel reduced speed considerably. In the prosperous early twentieth century, this speed drawback was overcome by increasing engine size and power.

The first screw ferries on the Manly run were two innovative Walter Reeks–designed vessels; the SS Manly (1896), and SS Kuring-gai (1901), which were to become the fore-runners of the Binngarra-class ferries. They both had high forecastles at either end to help her run through the deep-sea conditions across the Sydney Heads. The steel-hulled Kuring-gai was larger and she further refined the basic design to be similar to the subsequent and larger Binngarra-class vessels. Manly and Kuring-gai had both followed paddle steamer design with their bridges around the midships funnels. Whereas the Binngarra-class vessels would have their wheelhouses at either end of their promenade decks.

The Port Jackson & Manly Steamship Company's Binngarra-class ferries, Binngarra (1905), Burra-Bra (1908), Bellubera (1910), Balgowlah (1912), Barrenjoey (1913), and Baragoola (1922), were designed by Mort's Dock and Engineering, initially under the guidance of former chief draughtsman Andrew Christie. The first five were built at Mort's Woolwich yard and Baragoola was built at the Balmain yard. They were among the largest ships built in Australian yards at the time and, on the admission of Mort's executives, were built by the dock more for prestige than profit. Build costs were higher in Australia than in the United Kingdom, but this was offset by the cost of sailing them out to Australia.

== Design and construction ==
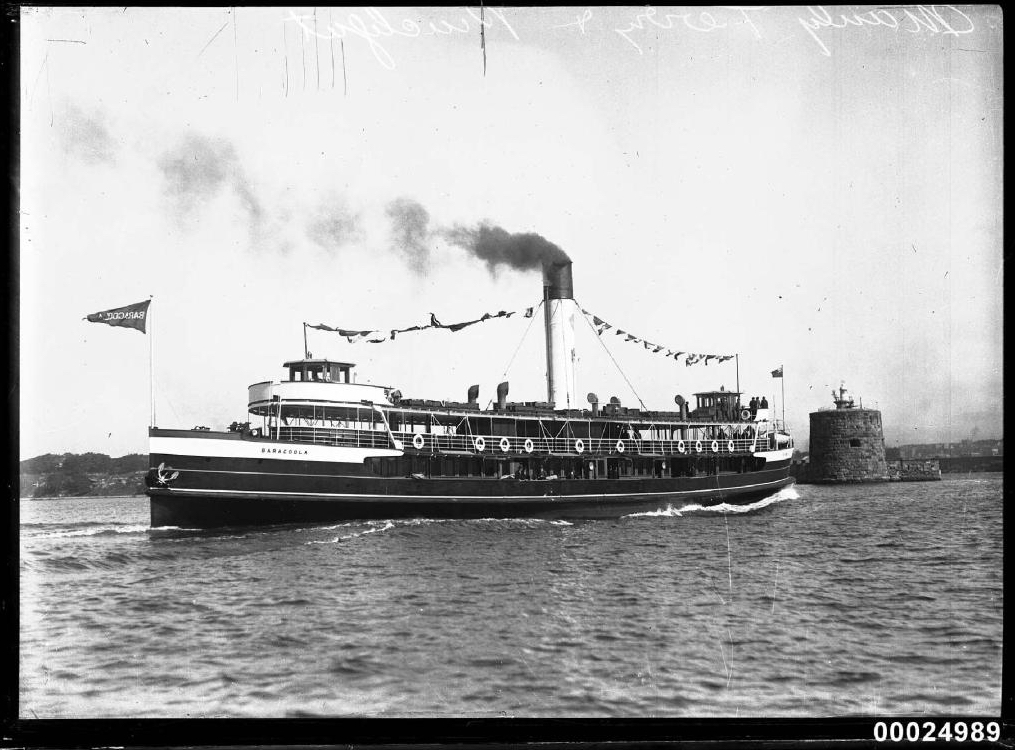
As a new ferry, performing sea trials in 1922

Baragoola was built at the Balmain yard of Mort's Dock. She was launched on 14 February 1922 by Mrs Hunter McPherson, the wife of the owning company's chairman of directors.

She was the sixth and final Binngarra type vessel. Although 6 metres (19 ft 8 in) shorter and with a greater beam (width at its widest point), she was otherwise similar to her older sister ships Binngarra (1905), Burra-bra (1908), Bellubera (1910), Balgowlah (1912), and Barrenjoey (1913 - later North Head). She cost £80,000 compared to £32,000 for Barrenjoey in 1913 and £29,000 for Balgowlah in 1912. The quickly rising cost of Australia-built ships led the Port Jackson Company to order their next vessels, Dee Why and Curl Curl, from the United Kingdom.

Baragoola is 498 tons and 60.7 metres (199 ft 2 in) long. As built, the vessel was powered by a three-cylinder triple expansion steam engine with cylinder diameters of 18 inches (46 cm), 28 in (71 cm), and 47.5 in (121 cm), with 27 in (69 cm) stroke, developing 1,300 indicated horsepower (970 kilowatts). It had two marine horizontal multitubular (navy type) boilers. During acceptance trials on 11 August 1922, she achieved an average speed of 14.7 knots (27.2 km/h; 16.9 mph) in 6 runs, with one maximum of 15 knots (28 km/h; 17 mph), over the measured mile. While this exceeded the contracted speed requirements, she was slower than her sister ships, and earning the name 'slow boat' due to her being 6 metres shorter and of greater beam. As a steamship her working speed was 14 knots (26 km/h; 16 mph). She can be distinguished from her older near-sisters by the rounded (vs. square) ends of the sun deck around each wheelhouse.

The layout of Baragoola's public spaces was typical of Manly ferries built until 1938. In her original open upper deck configuration, she had a summer capacity of 1,218 passengers, and a winter capacity of 926. Following her upper-decks being enclosed in the early 1930s, her capacity was 1,523 passengers. On the lower deck, aft, was a segregated Ladies Saloon with toilets, a main cabin and forward was a smoking saloon (usually reserved for men) with external toilets. This area also contained the original Mail Room and was the site of the later crew's mess. The internal hull arrangement has two void spaces at either end, a hold immediately aft of the forward void, the engine room behind the hold connected to the control room and (second from the aft) a compartment that contains batteries, auxiliary diesel tank, fresh water tank and the Engineer's Quarters.

She was fitted with electro-hydraulic steering equipment after World War II which replaced her earlier chain steering.

In 1961, the vessel was converted to diesel-electric and her tall funnel replaced with one short and squat. Four British Thomson-Houston 7-cylinder diesels were installed, generating a total of 2,000 bhp (1,500 kW), and driving two new English Electric electric engines, enabling her to achieve 16 knots (30 km/h; 18 mph). These engines are the only remaining operational ones of their type, having only ever been installed in three Manly ferries. The large steam ferry, Curl Curl was retired when Baragoola was recommissioned following her diesel-electric conversion.

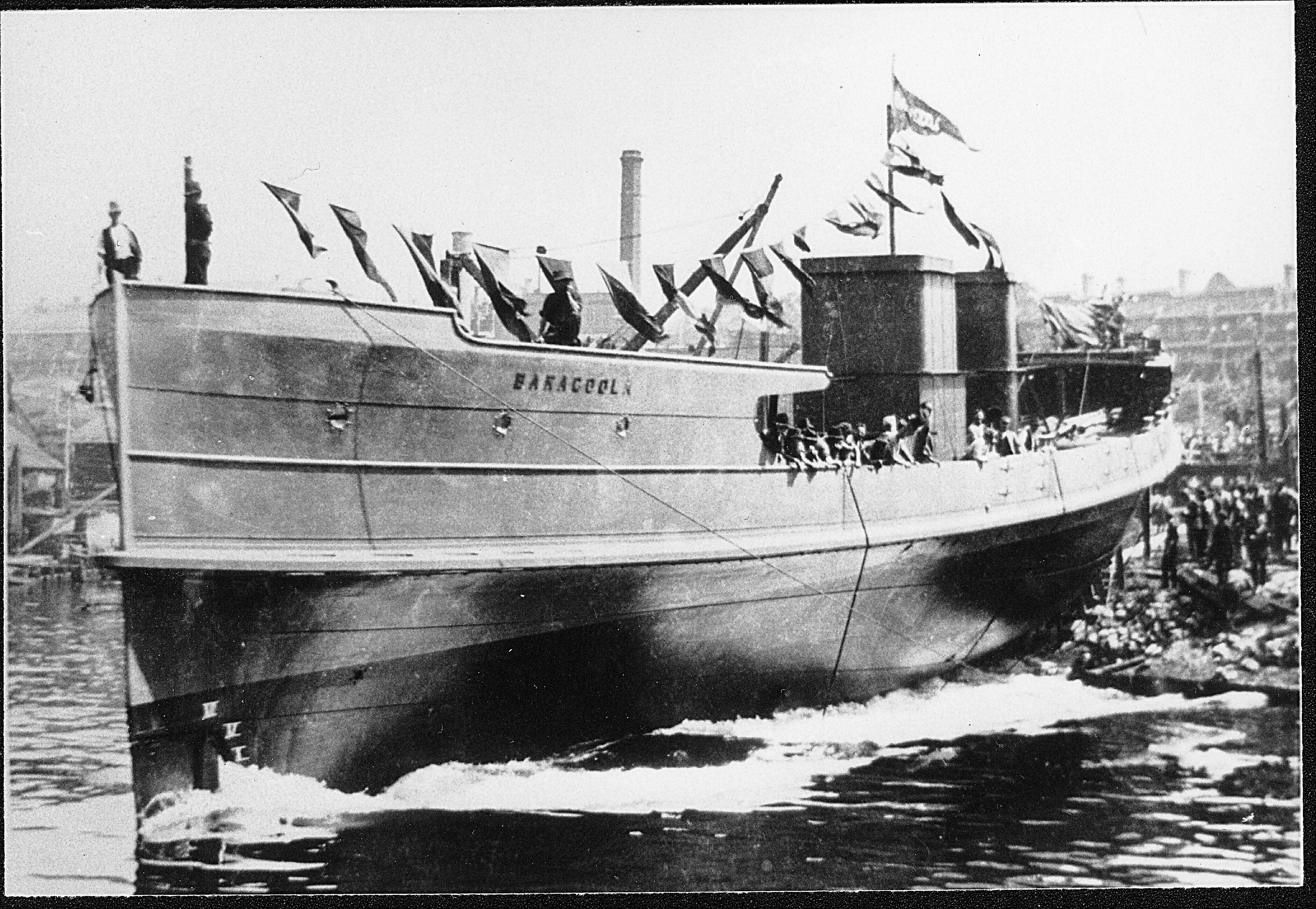
Being launched, 1922

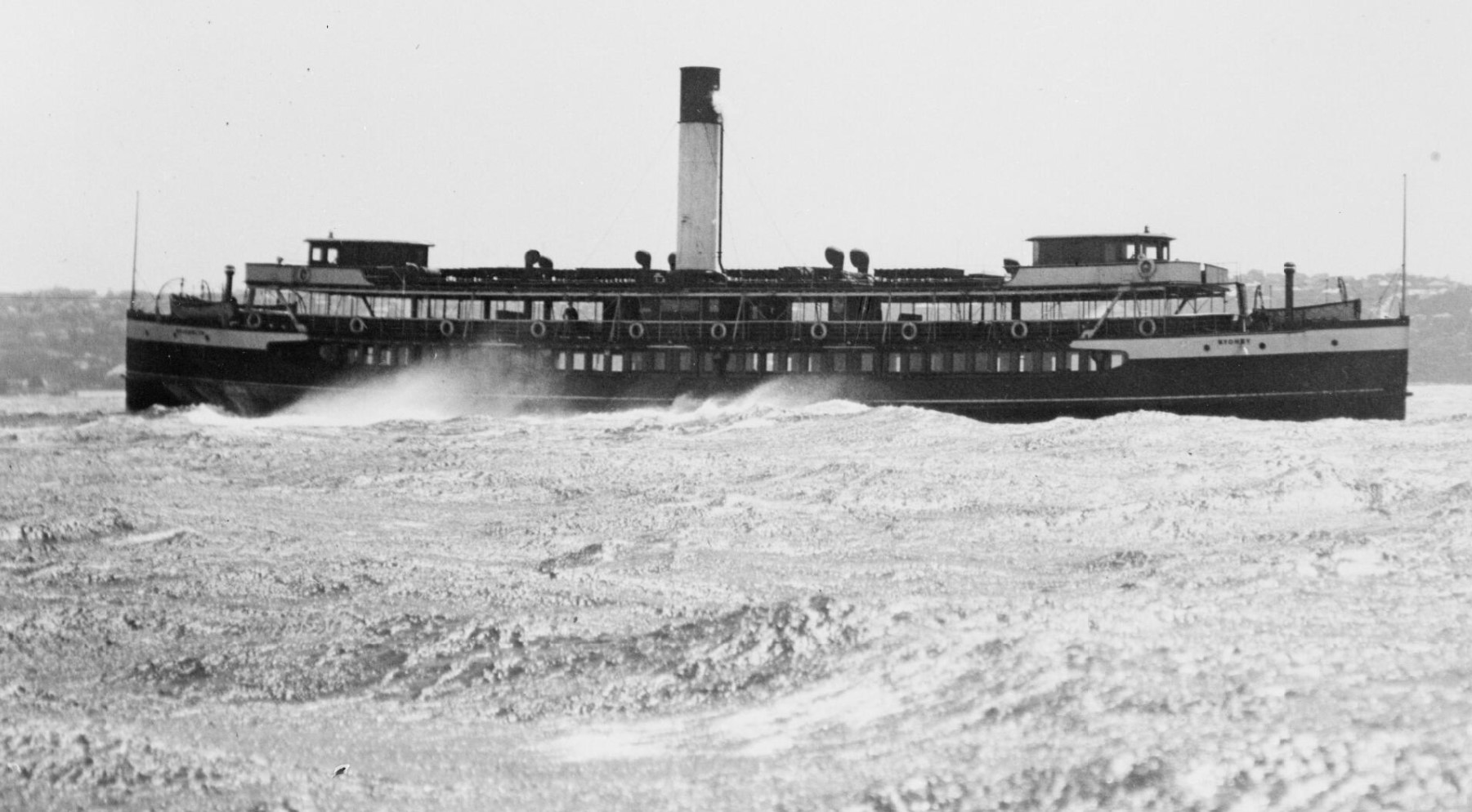
Crossing Sydney Heads early 1930s, after her wheelhouses were extended to provide officer accommodation

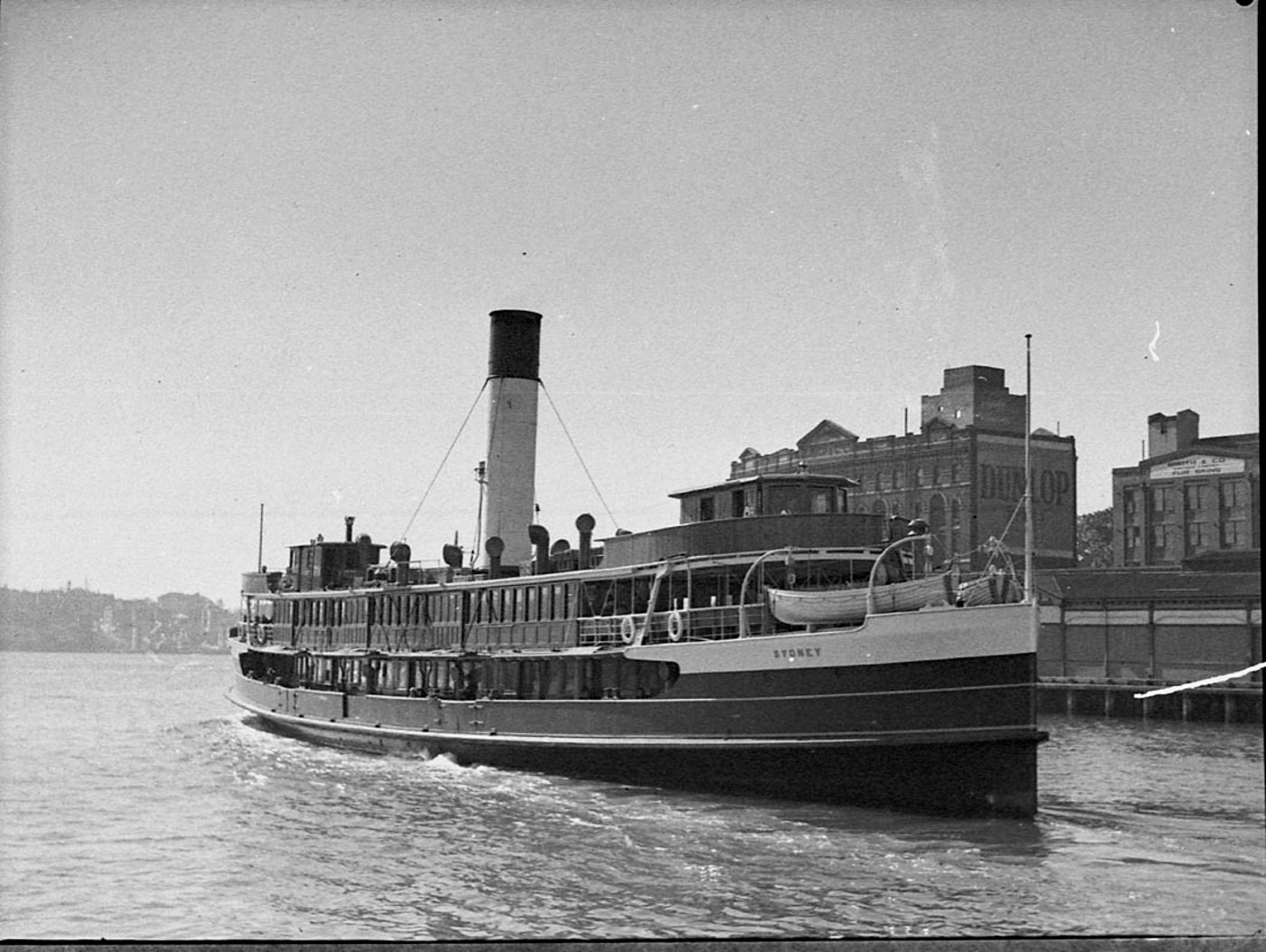
With her enclosed upper deck. Leaving Circular Quay, 1937.

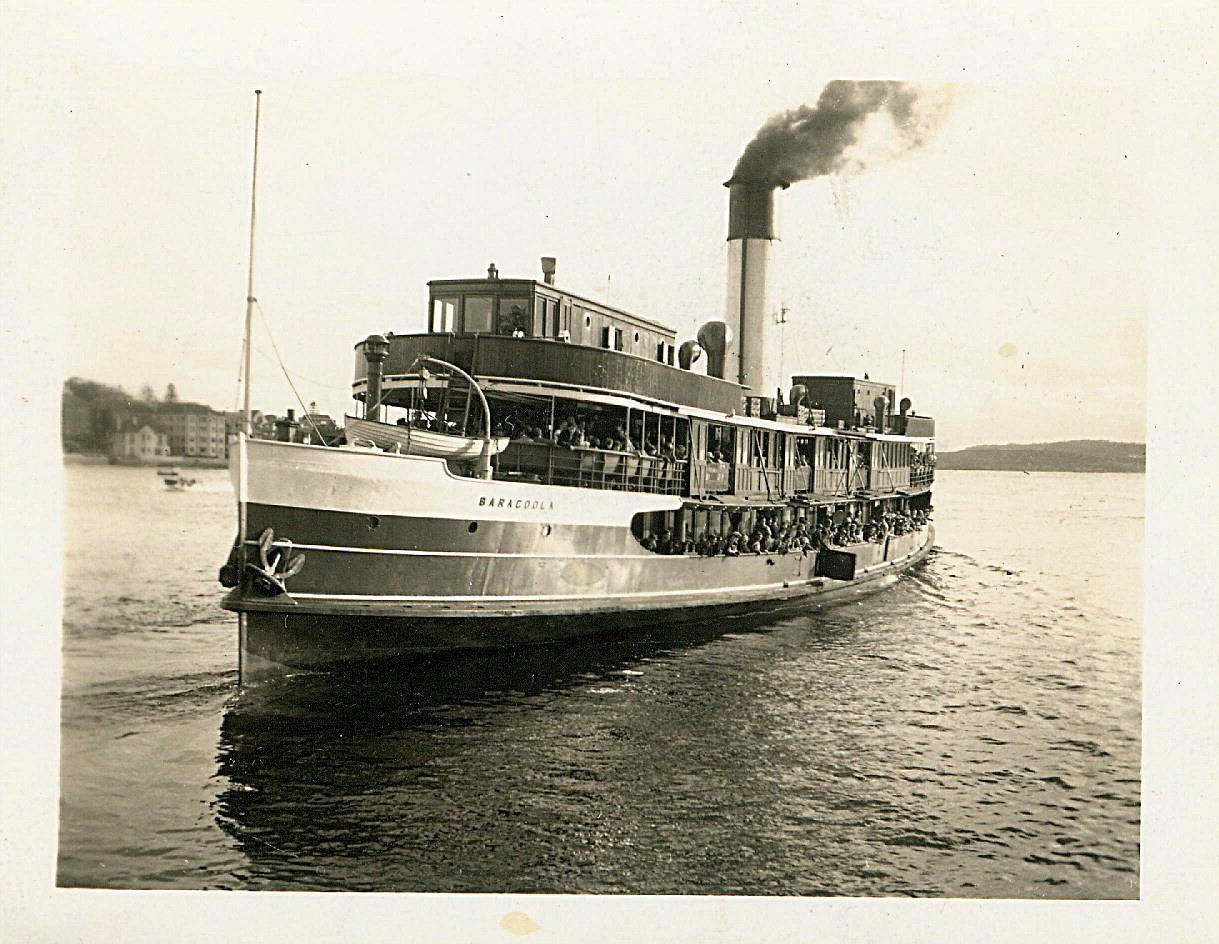
At Manly Wharf in 1951 as a steamer, showing the rebuild in the 1940s and full extension of her wheelhouses.

== Ferry service ==
Baragoola entered service on 3 September 1922.

Baragoola was involved in a number of collisions while in service. On Christmas Eve 1926, off Kirribilli Point, she collided with the Sydney Ferries Limited's Kosciusko. On 12 September 1927, Baragoola ran down a lifeboat from the French steamer Ville D'Amiens, five people were thrown out of the lifeboat, one of whom was hospitalised. The people were rescued by two fishing trawlers in the vicinity and the lifeboat was severely damaged. On 28 August 1934, Baragoola struck and killed a whale. The event was widely reported in the media when the disposal of the corpse took multiple attempts over nine days.

Like her sisters, Bellubera and Barrenjoey, Baragoola's open upper deck was closed-in in 1931/2, improving passenger amenities. At this time, she was modified to trial pulverised coal, however, this was stopped when the vessel and passengers were being showered in coal dust.

Between 8 March and 3 August 1939, Baragoola was converted to an oil burner using tar under natural draught, like the Curl Curl, Dee Why and South Steyne. Improved propellers were fitted at this time. The conversion to oil firing was reversed due to oil shortages during the war, however, with coal bunkers having been previously replaced by oil tanks, she could only make a couple of trips per day and she smoked badly without forced draft being available. Modifications in 1948 included the replacement of her chain-operated steering gear with Brown Brothers (later known as Vickers) hydraulic equipment. In 1958, Baragoola was withdrawn for a rebuild including the replacement of its steam engines with English Electric 7SKM diesel-electric engines. It returned to service in 1961. In 1973 and loaded with sight-seers, she took part in the on-Harbour celebrations for the opening of the Sydney Opera House.

Baragoola was included in the sale of Port Jackson & Manly Steamship Company to Brambles in April 1972. It had a re-fit in 1974. In December 1974, the Manly service was taken over by the NSW State Government and her traditional Manly ferry colours of green, cream and brown were replaced by the Public Transport Commission's blue and white. Following the 1982 delivery of the Freshwater, Baragoola was withdrawn on 8 January 1983 gaining significant media coverage. A second new ferry, Queenscliff, entered service in 1983, several years after which, the aging North Head was retired from service.

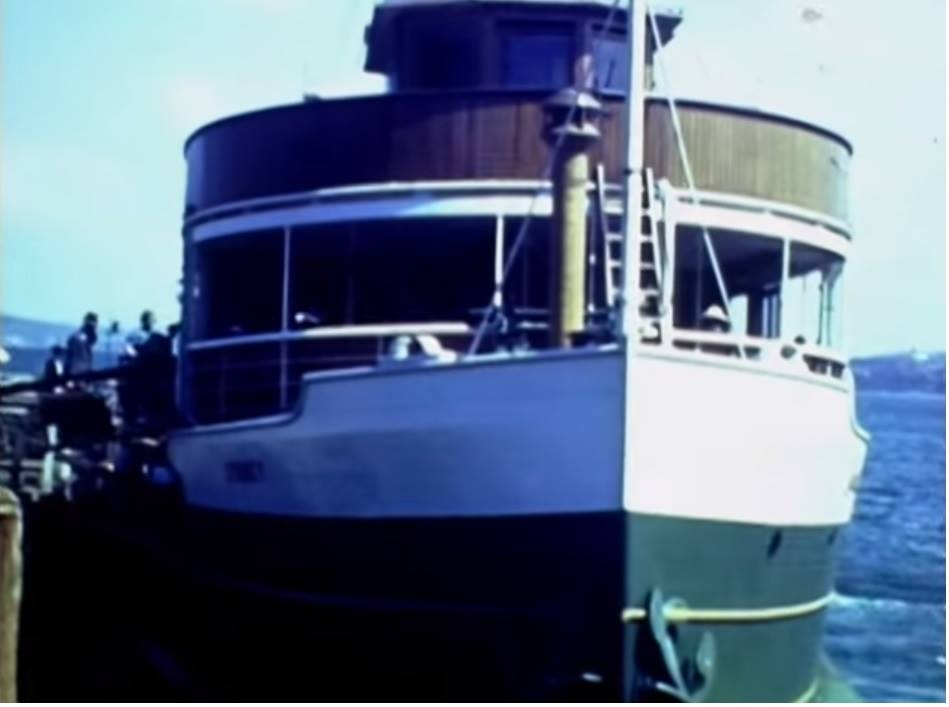
At Manly, 1940

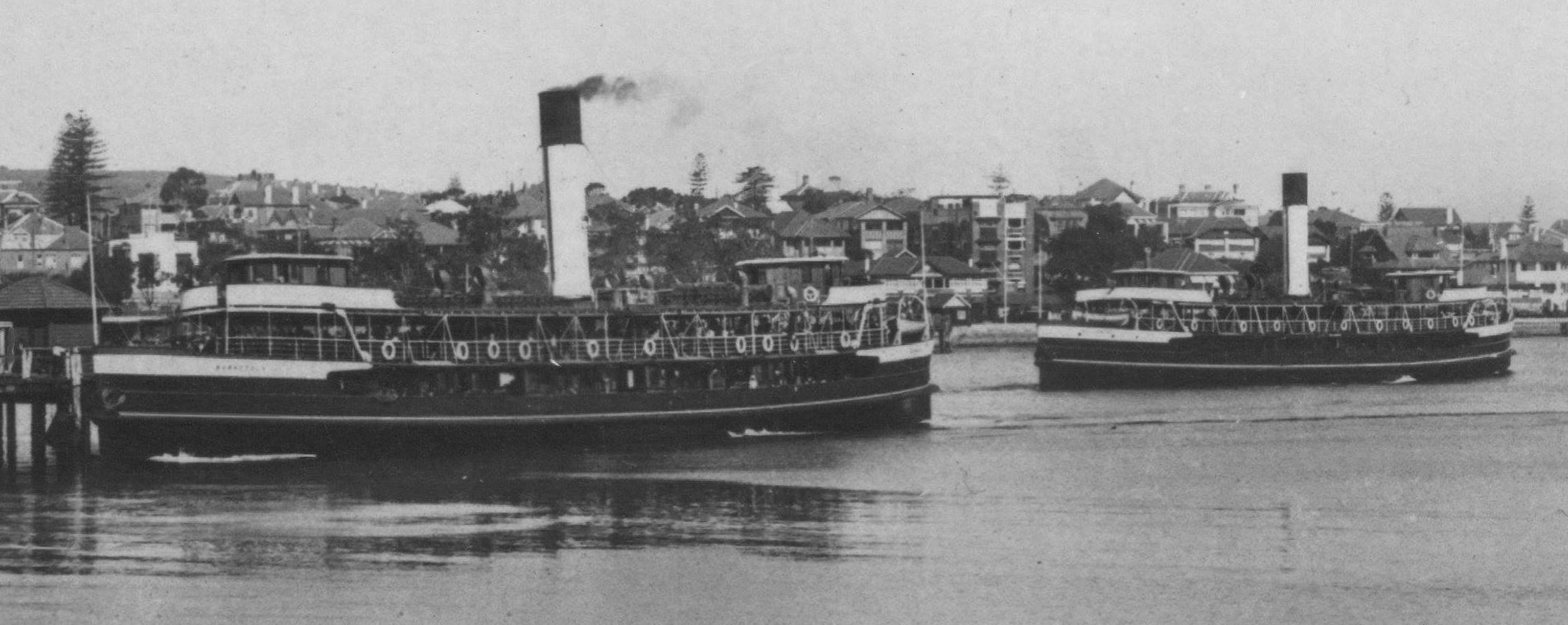
At Manly (left), 1930s

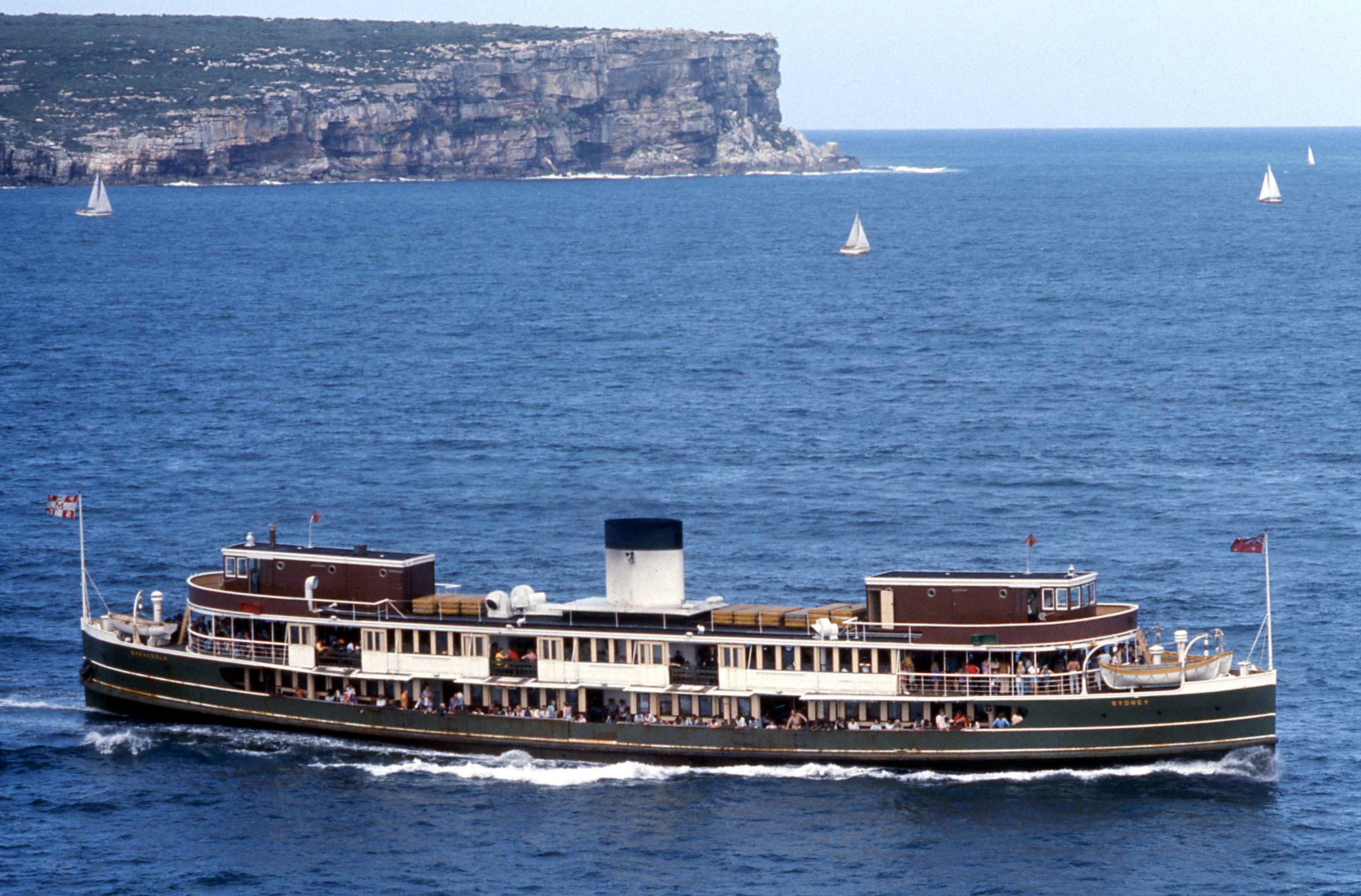
Crossing Sydney Heads with North Head in the background. As a Brambles Limited ferry, 1974.

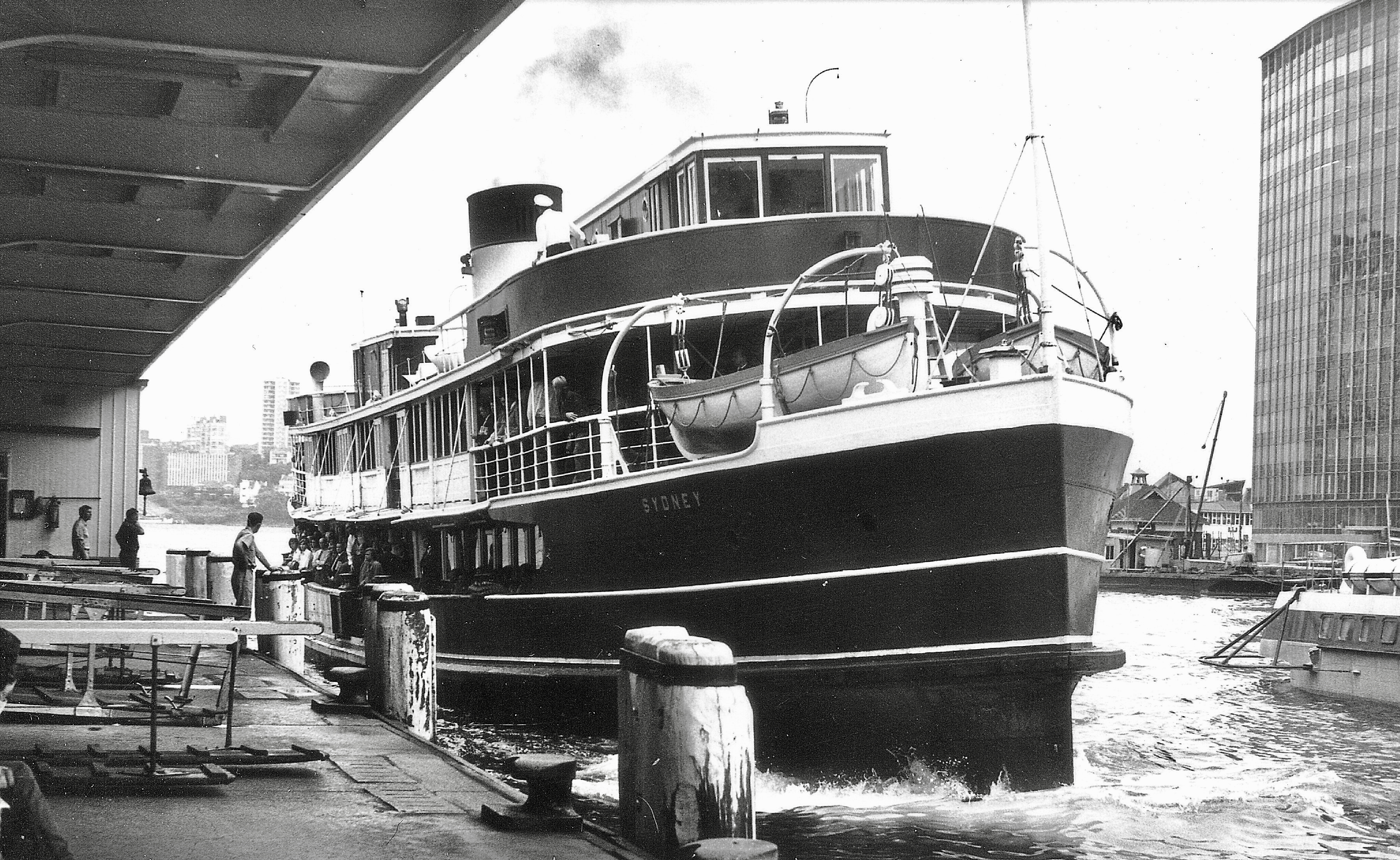
Late in her career, 1973

== Post service life ==
Baragoola was sold to Bob Hyde for use as an open university. The university never eventuated, and she was laid up at Rozelle Bay until 1988 when she was sold to David Ashton of Waterview Wharf, Balmain. In late 2003, she was evicted from Waterview Wharf and relocated to the Coal Loader in Balls Head Bay.

In 2009, following a period of animosity from NSW Maritime, Ashton offered the vessel for sale by auction and she passed into ownership of Adrian Thompson, who considered scrapping the vessel. In March 2010, Baragoola was sold to the Baragoola Preservation Association, a not for profit organisation who intended to restore the vessel.

An Australian Army training activity with Black Hawk helicopters and the adjacently-moored Cape Don damaged the vessel's upper works on 1 December 2010. The vessel is listed on the Australian Register of Historic Vessels.

During the evening of 1 January 2022, the ferry sank at its moorings before assistance to help pump water out of the vessel could arrive. Two squatters were on board and left the vessel before she sank. The ferry settled partially above water. Transport for NSW declared the ferry unable to be refloated and the decision was made to scrap her.

== Salvage and recycling ==
Birdon Pty Limited salvaged Baragoola from Sydney Harbour and cleared the berth pocket of vessel debris. Baragoola was cut into approximately 16 sections and lifted to the Birdon Barge "Pelican". "Pelican" was then unloaded at White Bay, where the sections were cut using excavator-mounted hydraulic shears before being removed from site.

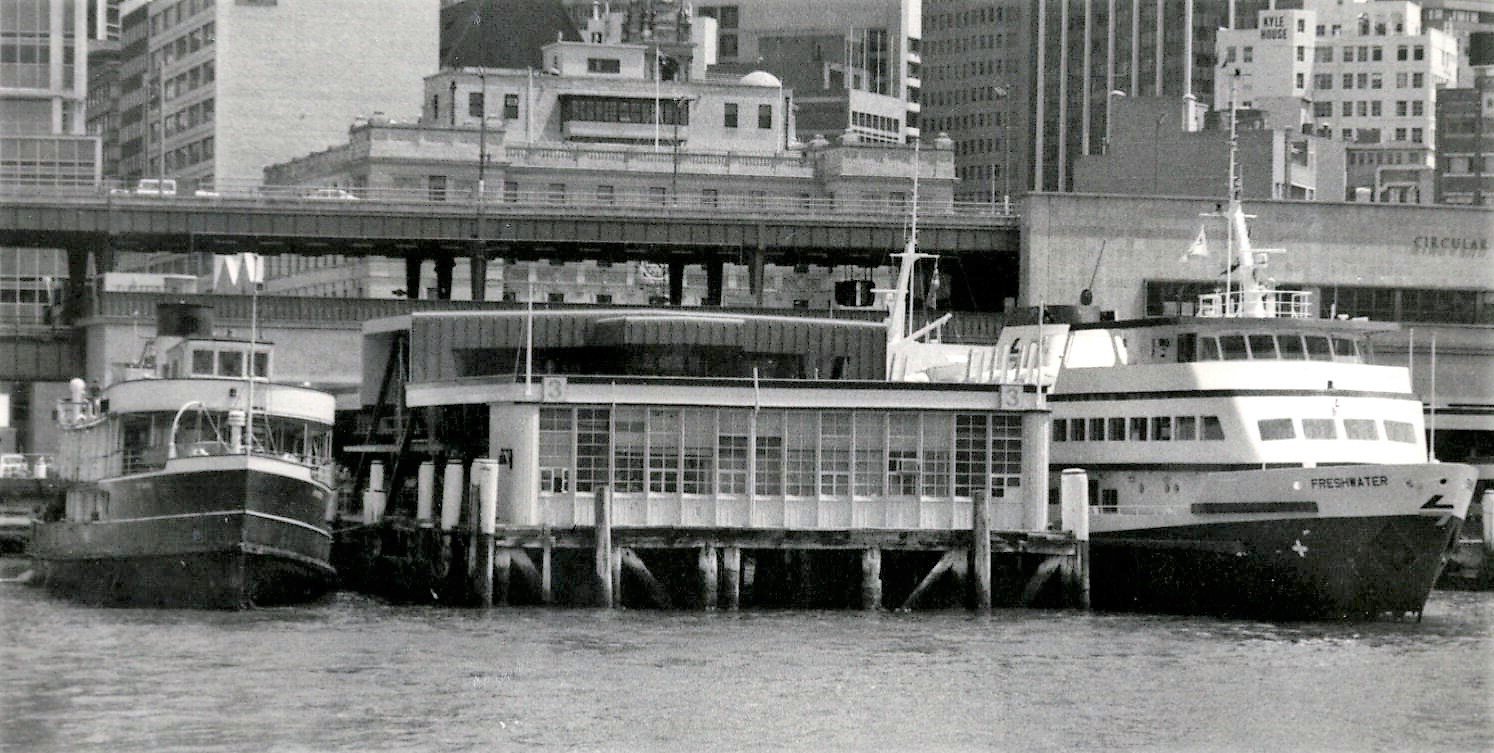
In her final months of service alongside her replacement, the then new Freshwater, 1982

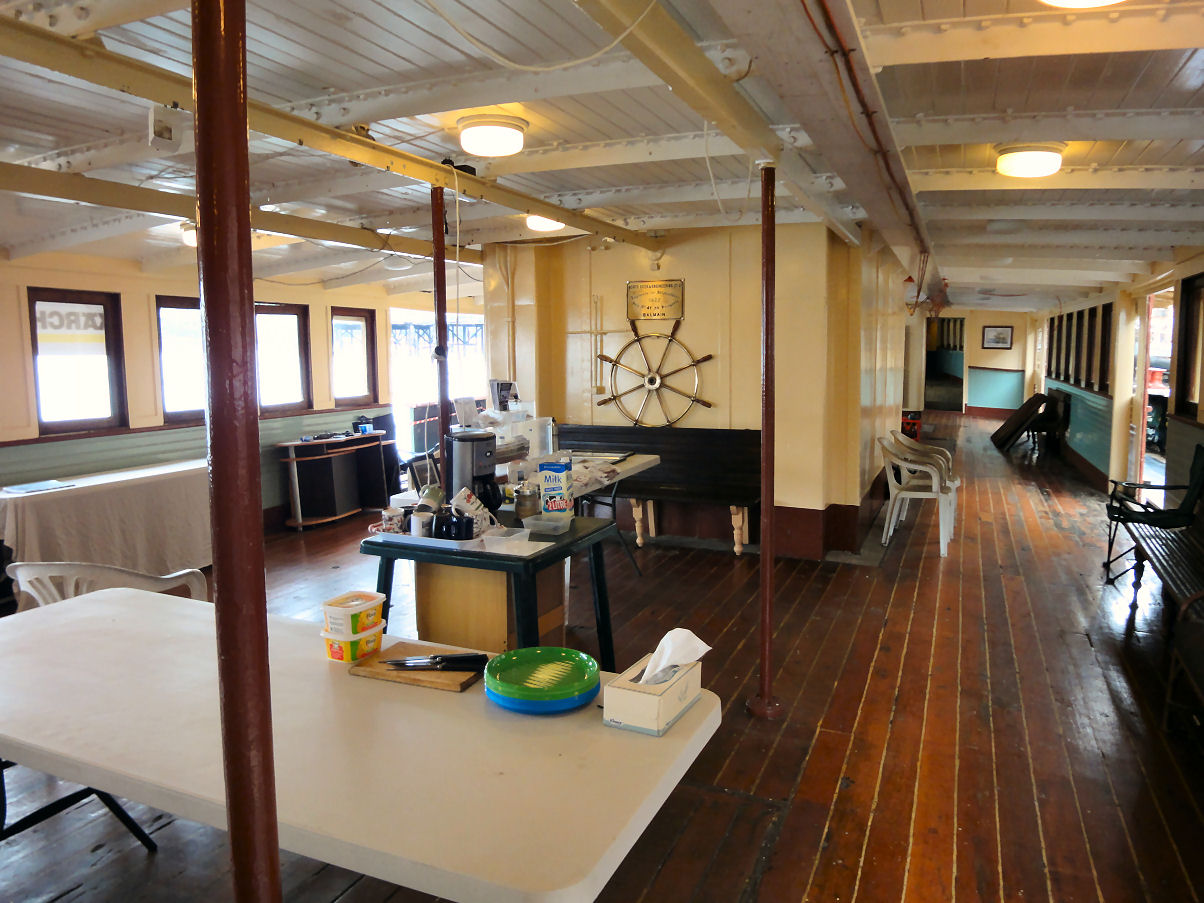
Main cabin, 2012

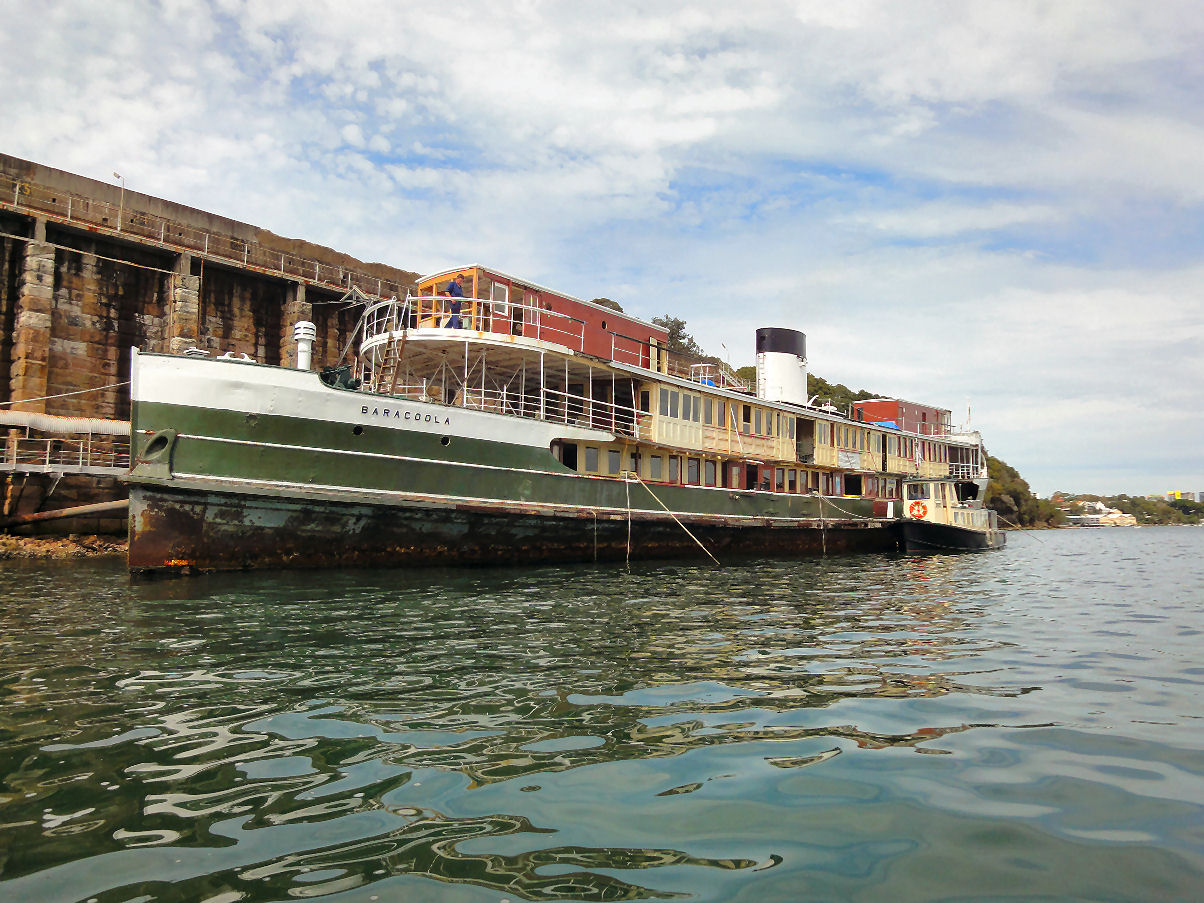
At Balls Head, 2012

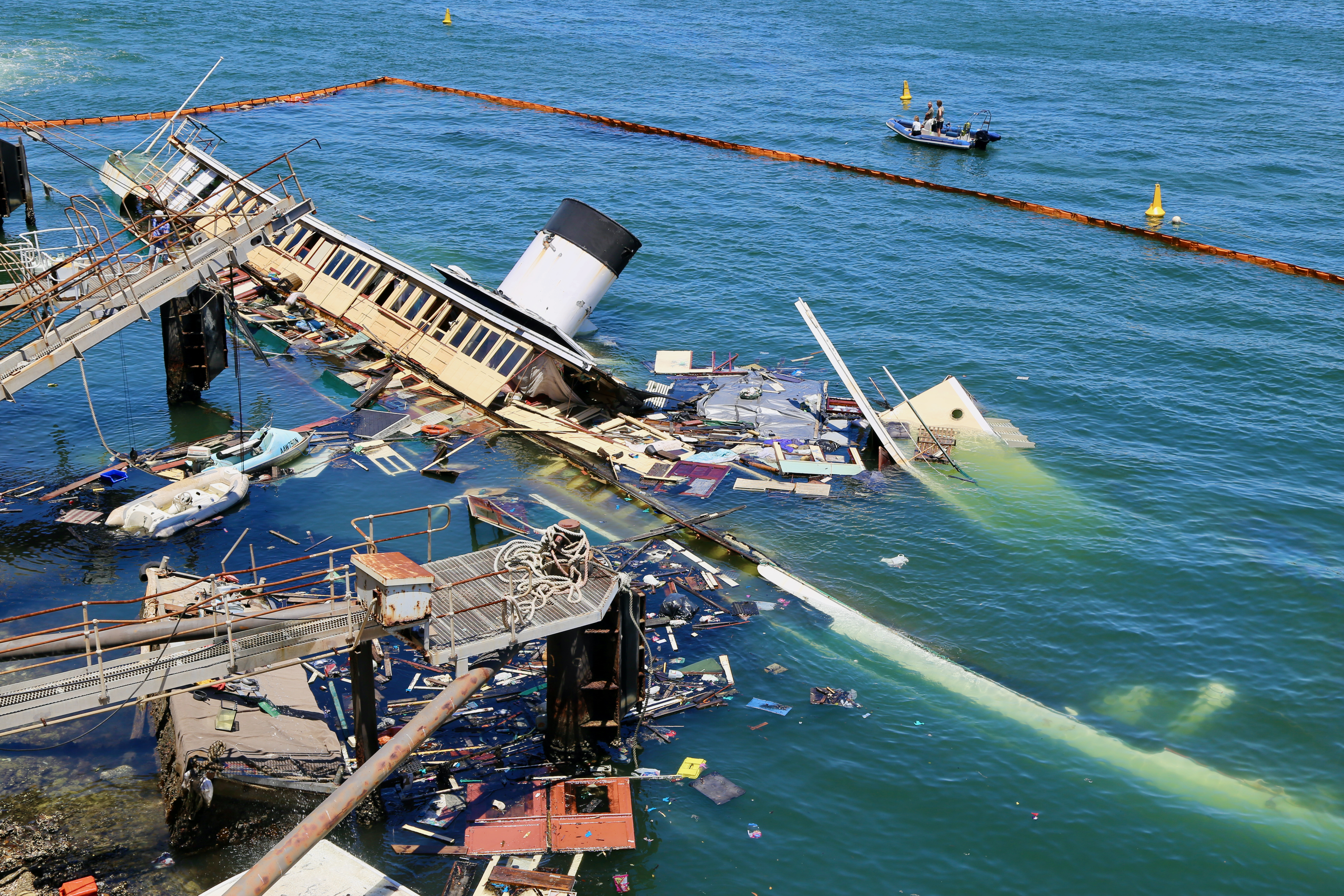
The morning after her sinking, 2 January 2022

== See also ==
- List of Sydney Harbour ferries
- Timeline of Sydney Harbour ferries
