= Dee Why-class ferry =

1928 class of Australian ferries

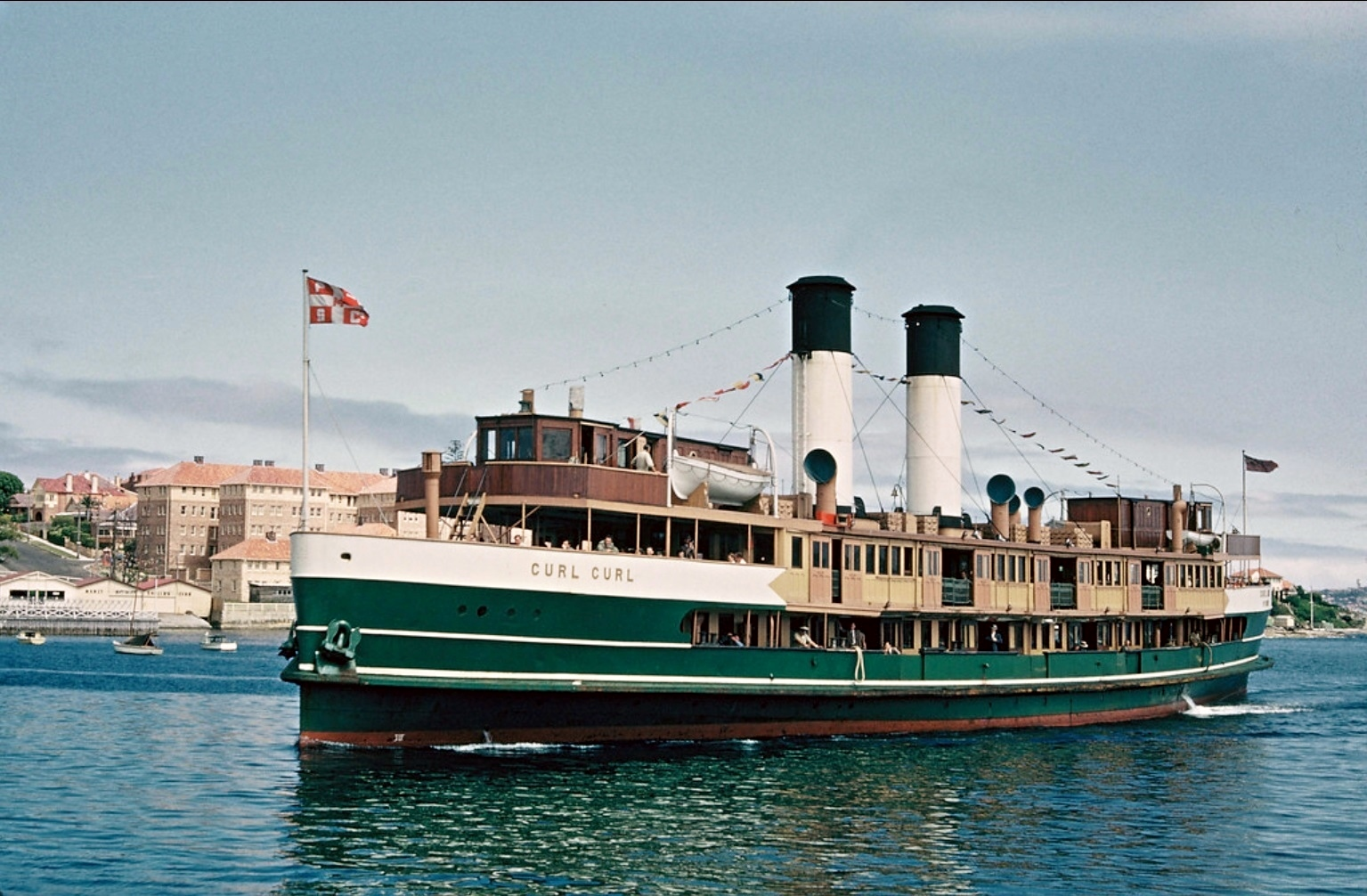
- Curl Curl approaches Manly Wharf, 1954

Class overview
- Builders: Napier & Miller, Old Kilpatrick, Glasgow, Scotland
- Operators: Port Jackson & Manly Steamship Company, Sydney, Australia
- Built: 1927/28
- In service: 1928–1968
- Completed: 2
- Retired: 2
- Scrapped: 2

General characteristics
- Type: Passenger ferry
- Displacement: 799.5 long tons (812 t)
- Length: 220 ft (67 m)
- Beam: 35 ft 11 in (10.95 m)
- Draught: 12 ft 6 in (3.81 m)
- Propulsion: 2 × Scotch boilers; 2 × D. and W. Henderson and Company triple expansion steam engines, 3,200 hp (2,386 kW); 2 shafts
- Speed: 18 knots (33 km/h; 21 mph)
- Capacity: 1,587 passengers

The Dee Why and Curl Curl, were two identical steam ferries servicing Sydney Harbour's Circular Quay to Manly service. Both commissioned in 1928, they were the largest ferries on Sydney Harbour until the 1938 introduction of the South Steyne.

Curl Curl was the fastest ferry on the harbour, able to do the Manly run in 22 minutes. Dee Why was only marginally slower. The two ferries were built in Scotland and steamed to Sydney under their own power. The cost to build them in Australia was too high, so the company looked to Scotland for their new ships. Curl Curl served until 1960 while Dee Why was in service until 1968.

The ferries were named after the Sydney suburbs of Dee Why and Curl Curl that lie north of Manly.

== Background ==
In the 1920s, the Port Jackson & Manly Steamship Company ran a seven-ship fleet comprising the Kuring-gai and six similar Sydney-built double-ended screw steamers: Binngarra (1905), Burra Bra (1908), Bellubera (1910), Balgowlah (1912), Barrenjoey (1913) and Baragoola (1922). Patronage was growing on the Manly service with fifty million passengers carried to and from Manly in the decade prior. By 1925, both Kuring-gai and Binngarra were aging and not meeting requirements of the service. With construction commenced on a Sydney Harbour bridge crossing, and expectations that a rail link to Manly would be built in 10 years (but never eventuated), the company was seeking faster and larger vessels to compete. Quotations from Australian builders were considered too high, and proposals were sought from Britain for the design and construction of the vessels. The company considered diesel propulsion; however, marine diesel technology was still in a relative infancy.

The contract for the vessels was awarded to Napier and Miller at Old Kilpatrick, Glasgow, Scotland. They would be the first Manly ferries since the 1883 paddlewheeler PS Brighton to be built in Britain rather than Australia. They were designed by naval architect E.H. Mitchell to a basic specification by W.L. Dendy, then the general manager of the PJ & MS Co. They were designed to provide a 17-knot service to compete with a proposed Manly and district train line that never eventuated.

== Design and construction ==
=== Hulls and superstructure ===
Dee Why and Curl Curl had double-ended steel hulls with a bar keel, 6 watertight bulkheads and timber decks. Their superstructures were steel up to promenade deck level and timber above this level. Each ferry displaced 799.5 tons of water, were 220 feet long, 35 feet 11 inches broad, and drawing 12 feet six inches of water when fully laden, considerably larger than their Binngarra-class predecessors (Barrenjoey, for example, was 500 tons).

As built, the built up sections of the bow were not extended far back and did not keep the boats dry. Initially, canvas dodgers were lashed behind the promenade deck railing. Circa 1930, the bulwarks were lengthened by extending the bow plating further back. They were extended again circa 1935 by replacing the promenade deck guardrails with further bulwark plating. Visually, this resolved the rather stumpy looking bows by extending the bow line. The bow modifications also provided an opportunity to visually distinguish the two identical vessels. The canvas dodgers lashed behind the promenade deck railings were cut differently for each vessel. When the bulwarks were fully extended, Dee Why's were finished with a white stripe which came to a point at each end, while on Curl Curl the point went the other way to form a 'swallow tail'. This painted distinction was removed in 1958 when both vessels were painted identically.

The two ferries introduced a new Bristol Green colour scheme to the Manly ferry service. The colour scheme replaced the old black, white-striped hull which the Manly fleet had carried since Phantom. The new scheme lasted until the sale of the service to the NSW Government in 1974 (after both Curl Curl and Dee Why were scuttled).

=== Accommodation ===
The vessels had three decks and a cabin flat. Navigation bridges and wheelhouses were located at the fore and aft ends of the sun deck. Originally there was one cabin attached to each wheelhouse on the sun deck, and later two. Three lifeboats on sun deck (later supplemented by one workboat). Crew's cabin was on forward cabin deck. Other equipment included a wireless (provided 1928) and radio-telephone (provided in 1955). In 1947, two additional cabins were provided on the sun deck attached to wheelhouses. The same year, Brown Bros. electro-hydraulic steering controlled by telemotor was added.

Passenger accommodation included a Ladies' Saloon with padded benches and the promenade deck house with reversible padded benches. Passenger housing was also on the main, promenade and cabin decks. Outside seating on the main deck and lower cabins was wood benches. Both ferries were the first in the Manly fleet to be built with enclosed upper decks, a marked improvement for passengers on all preceding ferries' windswept open decks. Four of the six existing Binngarra-class vessels had their open upper decks glazed-in during the 1930s. Padded reversible seats were also introduced in contrast to the older ferries' fixed wooden benches. A smoking saloon was provided on the lower deck and cafeteria was originally provided on both vessels. Passengers could order breakfast, lunch, dinner or supper which was served with silver cutlery embossed with the company's insignia.

There were eight gangway exits on each on the promenade and main decks. Three double stairways (fore, aft and amidships) connected the main and promenade decks, and two single stairways to the fore and aft cabins. Each ship required thirteen crew and could carry up to 1,587 passengers, a capacity that was reduced to 1,199 in rough weather.

=== Machinery ===
They were the second-last steam powered ferries built for the PJ & MS Co, possessing inverted direct-acting four-cylinder triple-expansion fully reversible steam engines manufactured by David and William Henderson and Co, of Glasgow, producing 3,200 horsepower. The cylinders were 24", 37", 46", 46" × 33". They drove a single screw at each end through a "push-pull" principle. The propellers were of solid bronze with four blades, being nine feet three inches in diameter.

Steam for the engines was provided by four single-ended cylindrical Scotch boilers, placed in pairs back to back in two stokeholds, and fitted for burning either oil or coal. This arrangement necessitated the use of two funnels, which, because of the arrangement of the boilers, had to be placed slightly forward of amidships, resulting in a strangely asymmetrical appearance. Each boiler was 11 feet six inches long and 12 feet wide. Four boilers, uneconomically, required two stokers, although only two boilers and one stoker were needed for normal service speed. The boilers were heated with two "Deighton" 3' 8" internal diameter furnaces per boiler with forced draught burning. The vessels had steam assisted steering, electric lighting, chemical fire extinguishing and Mechams engine room telegraphs.

The Dee Why was launched by Mrs J L Goodwin on 28 December 1927 and her fitting out was completed in March 1928. Curl Curl was launched on 27 February 1928 by Mrs H.A.M. Napier. Curl Curl undertook trials on the Firth of Clyde on 24 May 1928.

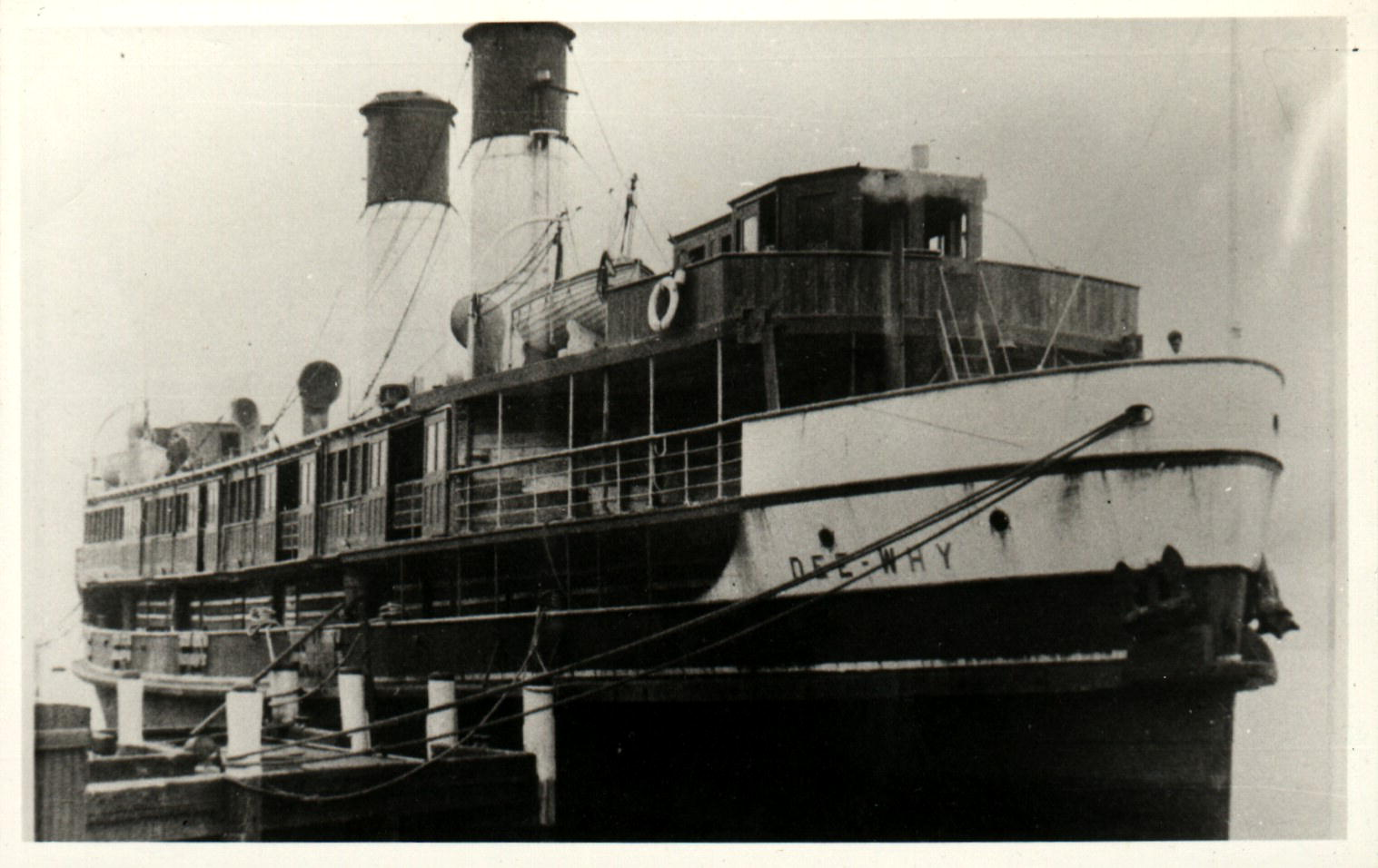
Dee Why's arrival in Sydney from Scotland, 1928

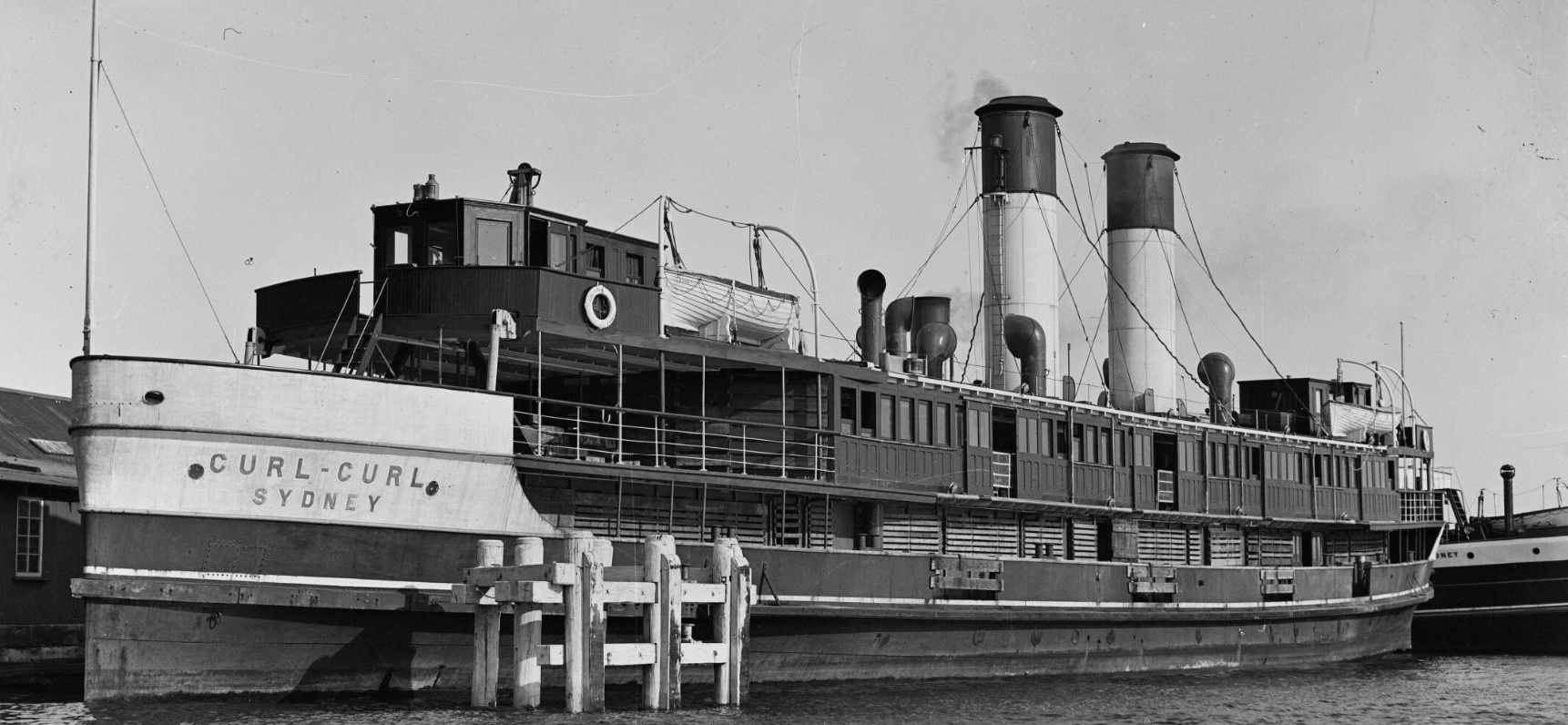
Curl Curl newly arrived in Sydney and still boarded up, 1928

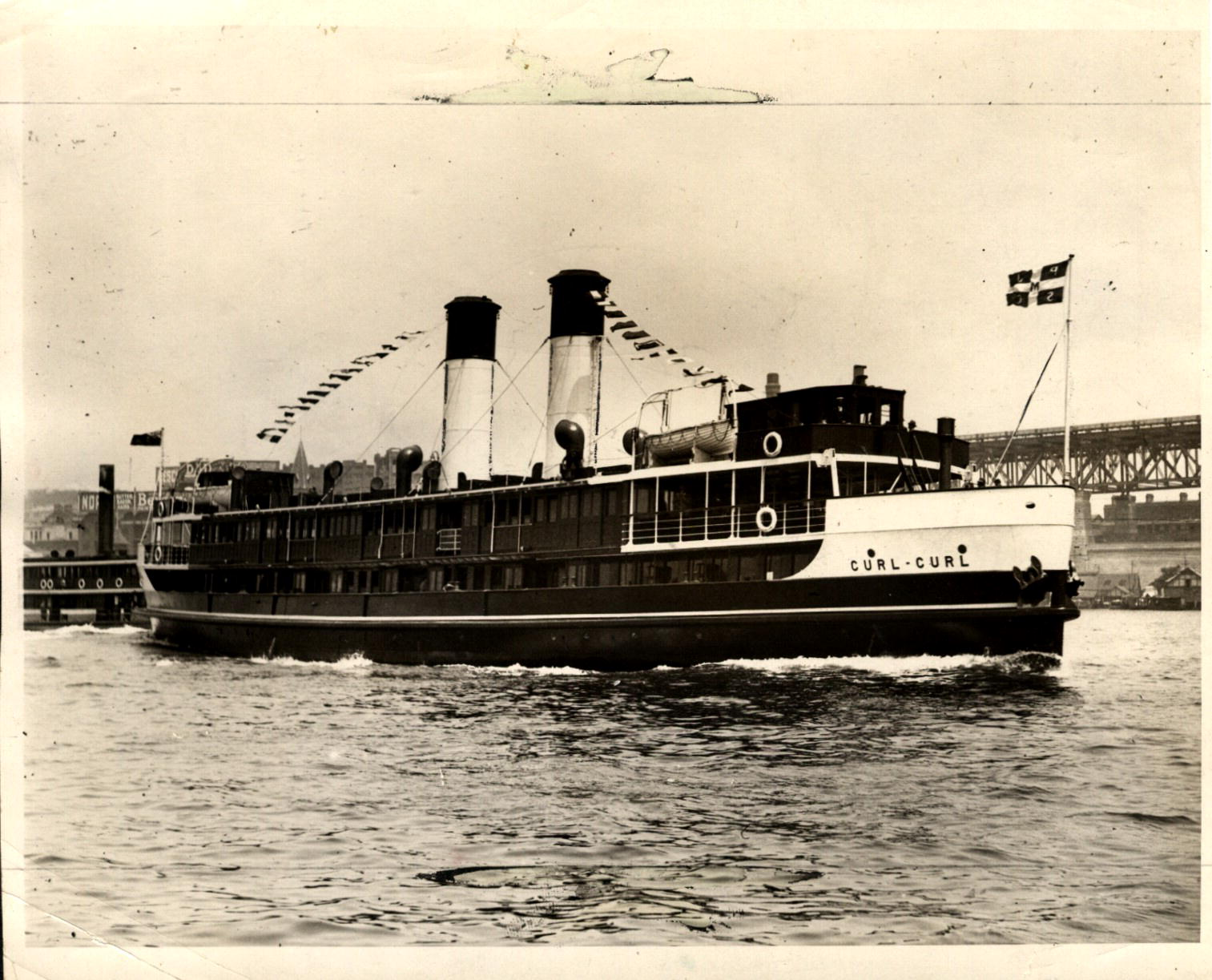
On her first official trip to Manly, 30 November 1928

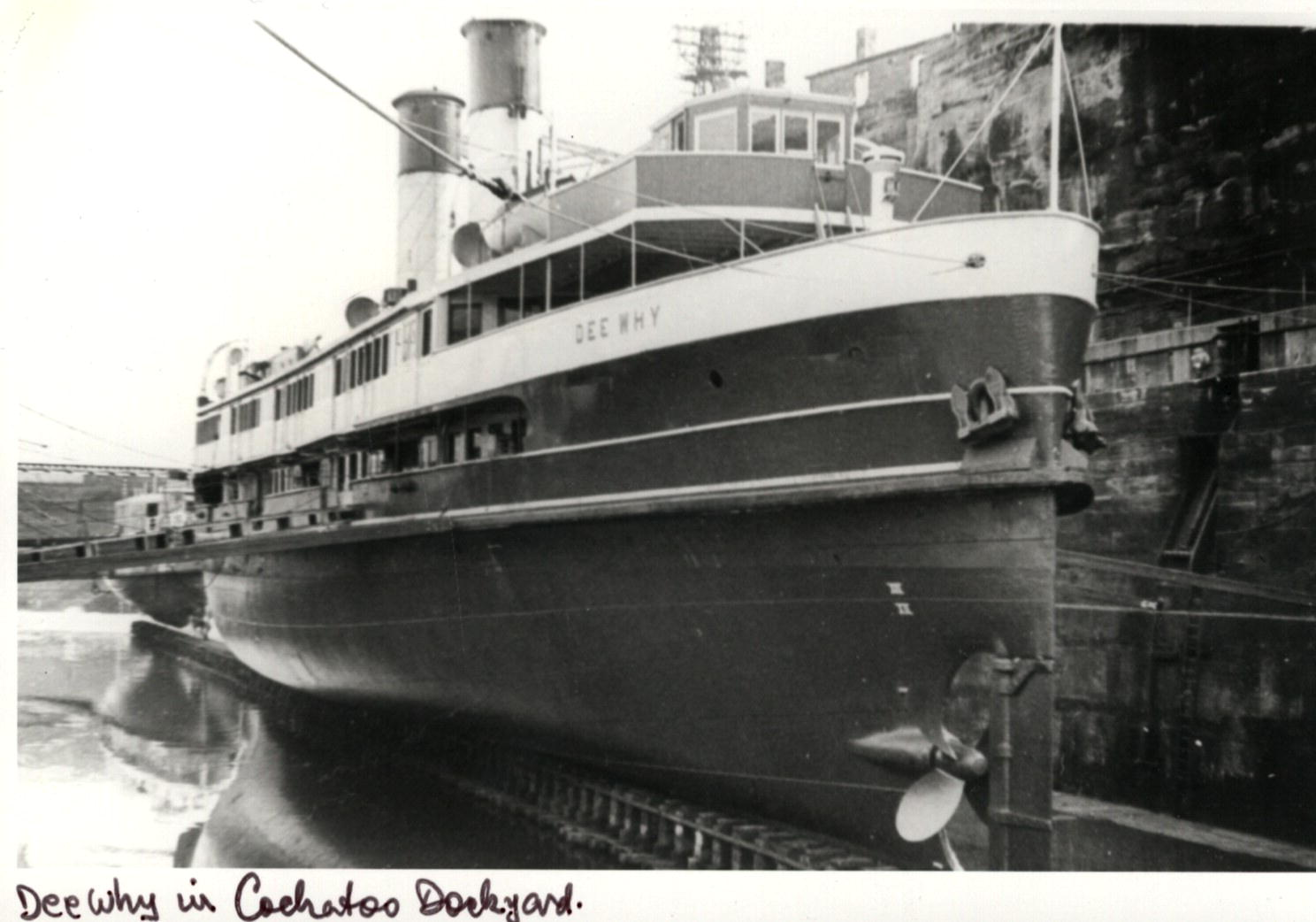
Dee Why in Cockatoo Dock after having hull cleaned and repainted, 1950

== Delivery voyage ==
Both vessels travelled from Glasgow to Sydney under their own steam. Dee Why left Glasgow on 25 May 1928 under the command of Captain G Brown and Curl Curl left on 1–2 June 1928 under Captain Abrahm and a crew of eighteen. To save costs, each vessel used only one of four available boilers.

A storm in the Bay of Biscay ripped off part of Dee Why's sponson and water was taken with pumps blocked from builder's debris. At one point, Dee Why broke a main steampipe and she drifted for 10 hours until taken under tow by a tramp steamer. She was laid up in Algiers for eight days for repairs. The crew become apprehensive about continuing, and the Captain lost the support of some of the officers. After travelling through the Suez Canal, Curl Curl was held up by the Aden harbour master to see out the tropical monsoon but Dee Why was told to proceed. Ultimately, both boats stayed in Aden for two months during which time most of the crew had to be forced on board. A stowaway on Dee Why was contracted in place of a fireman who refused to work. Rough weather was experience between Aden and Colombo and the ships continued past Java stopping at Surabaya on its north-east coast.

Once in Australian waters, Dee Why anchored each night inside the Great Barrier Reef and without a steam winch, her anchor was handled manually with the assistance of a hand winch. Seventy miles from Sydney, Dee Why ran into a southerly gale and sheltered for 37 hours at Cape Hawke. Curl Curl, with a crew of eighteen under the command of Captain Abrahams, arrived in Sydney 8:15 a.m. on 1 October 1928. Dee Why arrived in Sydney at 2:00 a.m. on 1 November 1928, a journey time of 5 months and 10 days.

== Service history ==
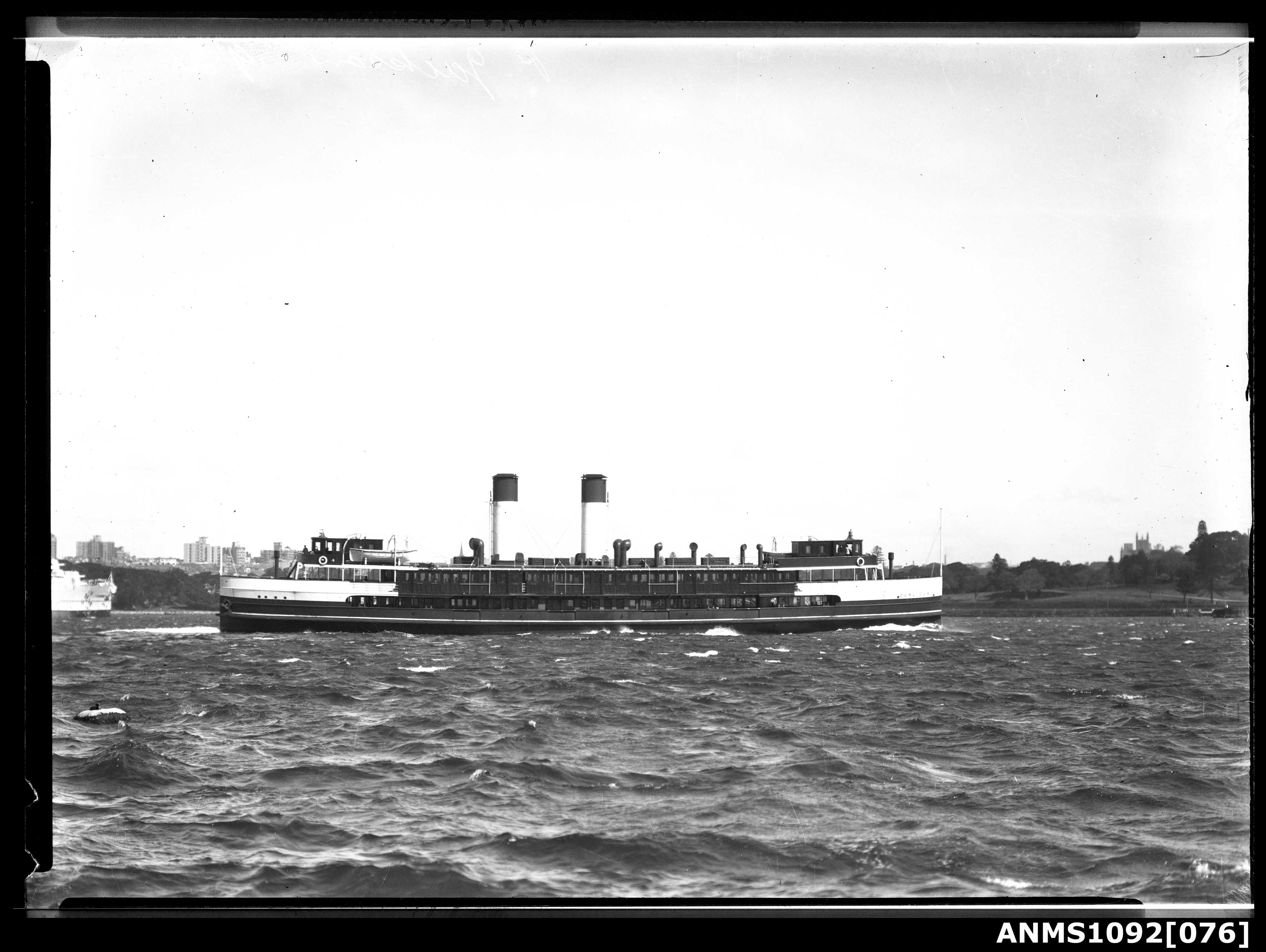
Curl Curl on Sydney Harbour in 1930

Curl Curl was registered in Sydney on 26 October 1928 and Dee Why on 2 November 1928. Curl Curl was fitted with a bow propeller and rudder for her double-ended service configuration, and her official trials were on 30 November 1928 and Dee Why on 24 December 1928. Both ships exceeded 17.5 knots on their trials. Curl Curl is thought to have been the fastest conventional single displacement hulled ferry on Sydney Harbour, with the current Freshwater-class ferries considerably slower. Only the later hydrofoils (introduced 1960s) and catamarans (introduced 1990s) have been faster. Dee Why was marginally slower. Soon after her arrival in Sydney, Curl Curl ran a trial trip to Manly in twenty-five minutes with three knots to spare. The next day, with officials on board, Bellubera was given a 12-minute head start from Circular Quay, and was passed by Curl Curl at Middle Head, equivalent to three quarters of the distance to Manly. Returning to Circular Quay, she reached 17.75 knots. When the two sisters were run free (i.e., continuously and not to a time-table) to move Anniversary Day crowds in 1936, they completed trips in 22 minutes, which required an average 18 knots (the vessels' theoretical maximum). The South Steyne of 1938, could only manage a 23-minute trip.

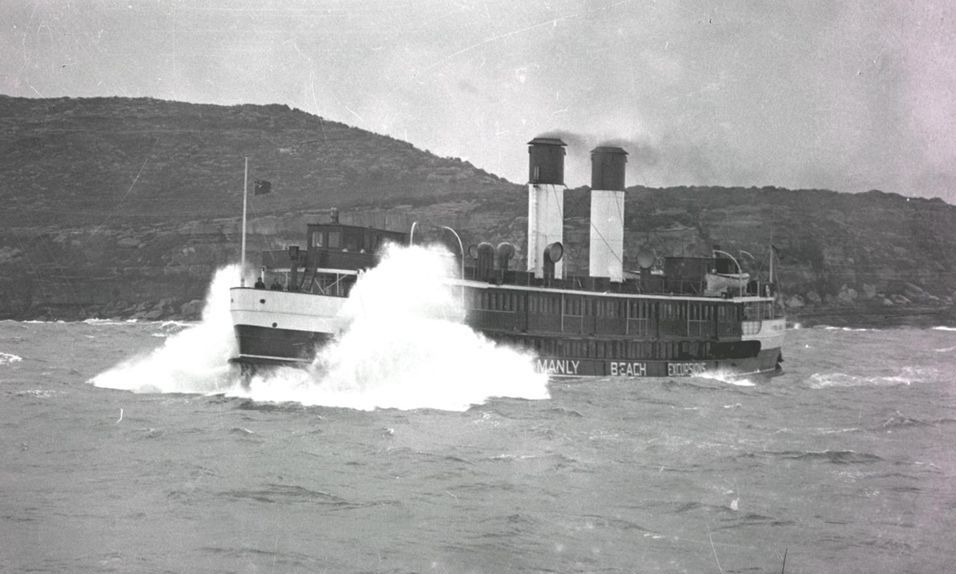
Curl Curl steaming across the Sydney Heads

Curl Curl and Dee Why entered service on 6 December 1928 and 25 December 1928, respectively. They proved most popular with the traveling public and attracted significant extra patronage for the company. They were not only bigger and faster than preceding ferries including—Binngarra, Burra Bra, Baragoola and Barrenjoey—but also better sea boats and better appointed. They were the first Manly ferries with glassed in upper decks and had reversible upholstered seating replacing the hard wooden benches of the older Manly ferries. Company chairman, Hunter McPherson, described them as "splendid carriers, fast, excellent sea boats, economical to run, wonderfully easy to handle under conditions".

The company enjoyed a patronage boom in the 1930s, aided by the two new vessels, the early-1930s upgrade and upper deck enclosure of the four older Binngarra-class vessels, and opening of Manly pool. Once Dee Why and Curl Curl were introduced, the company's older two vessels, the Kuringai (1901) and Binngarra (1905) were sold and Burra Bra (1908) was used as a reserve boat. The vessels' cafeterias were closed by the mid-1930s.

Curl Curl and Dee Why spent 20 years carrying massive crowds, particularly during the war when all passenger records were broken. In 1951, Curl Curl and Dee Why made 13,468 trips compared to 14,907 by the other four ships in service. By the mid-1950s, however, patronage fell impacting the company's fortunes and the two ships were beginning to age. Both vessels were mortgaged to the Commercial Bank, Sydney from 4 August 1950 with the mortgages being discharged on each of the vessels sales. The two steamers were faster than their running mates, but they were costly to run. After Balgowlah was withdrawn from service and Barrenjoey (as North Head), Baragoola & Bellubera had been converted to diesel, the twins were shown to be very expensive to run with their bunker oil costing far more than diesel.

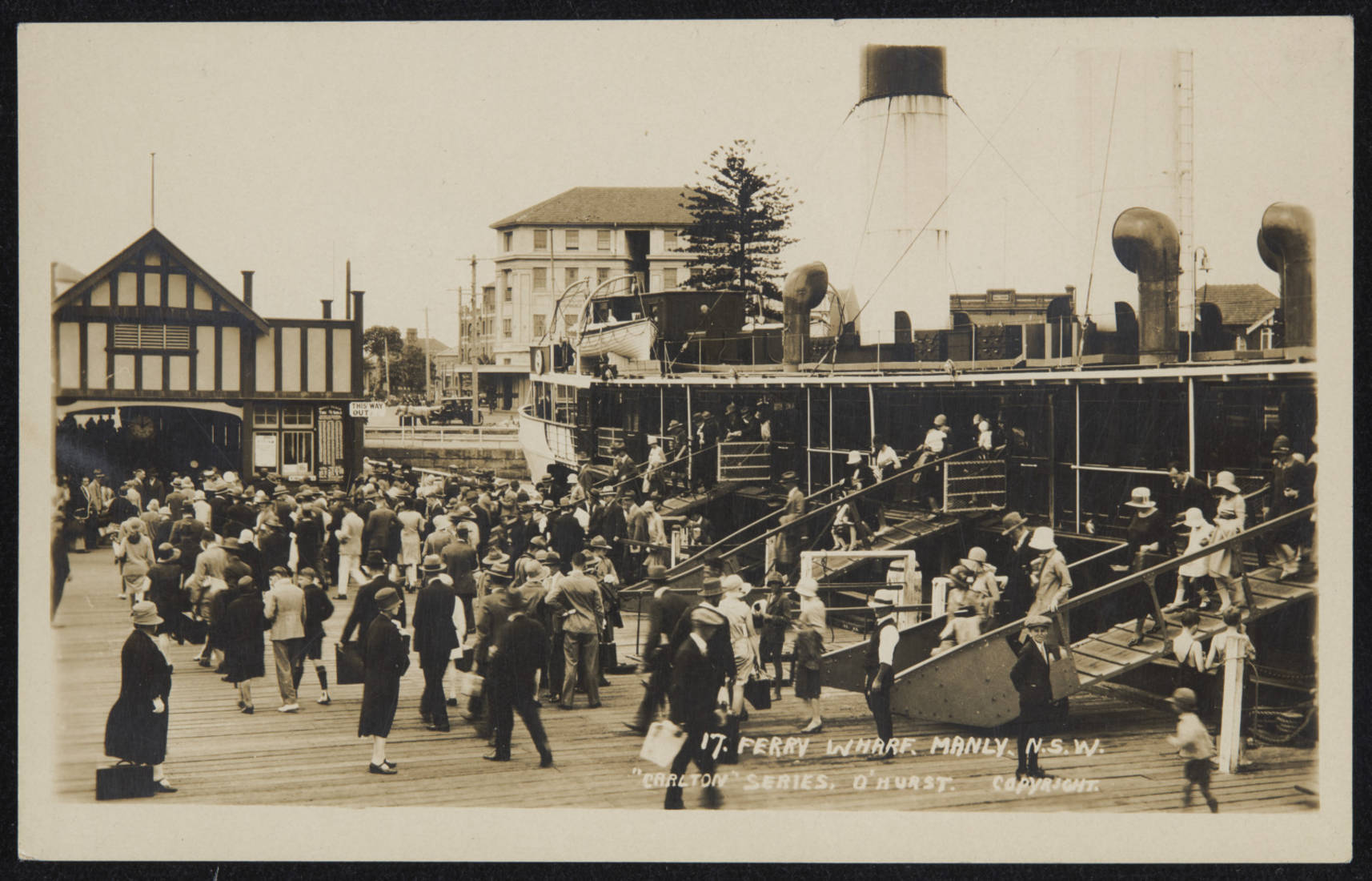
Dee Why at Manly Wharf between 1930 and 1937

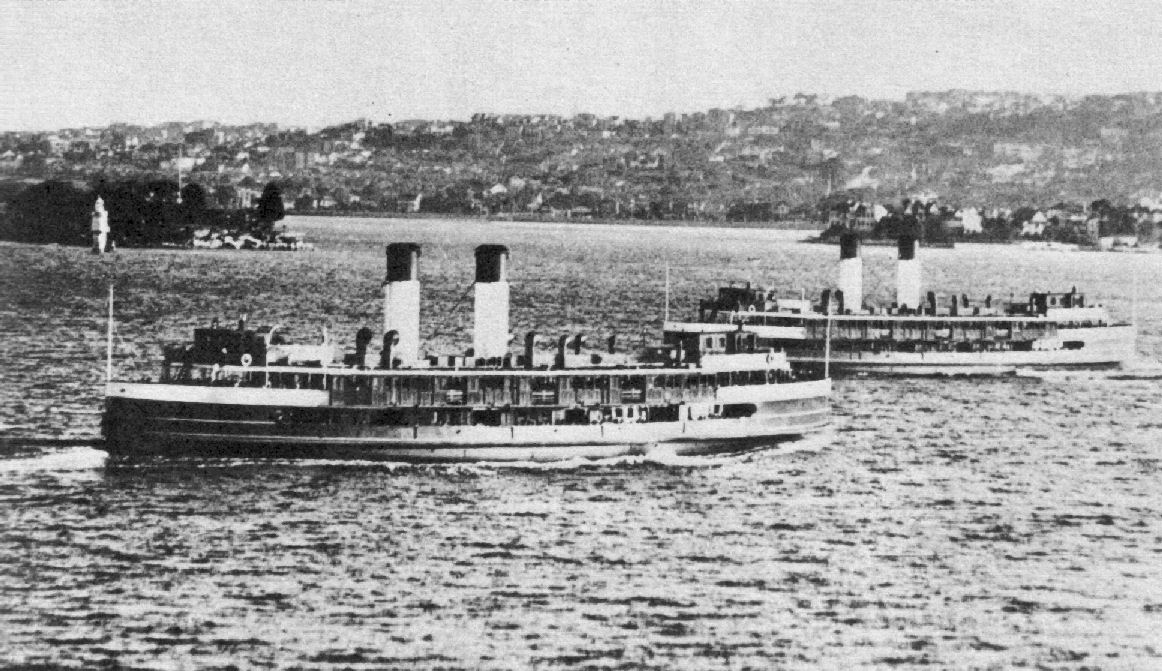
Dee Why and Curl Curl pass each other, late 1930s

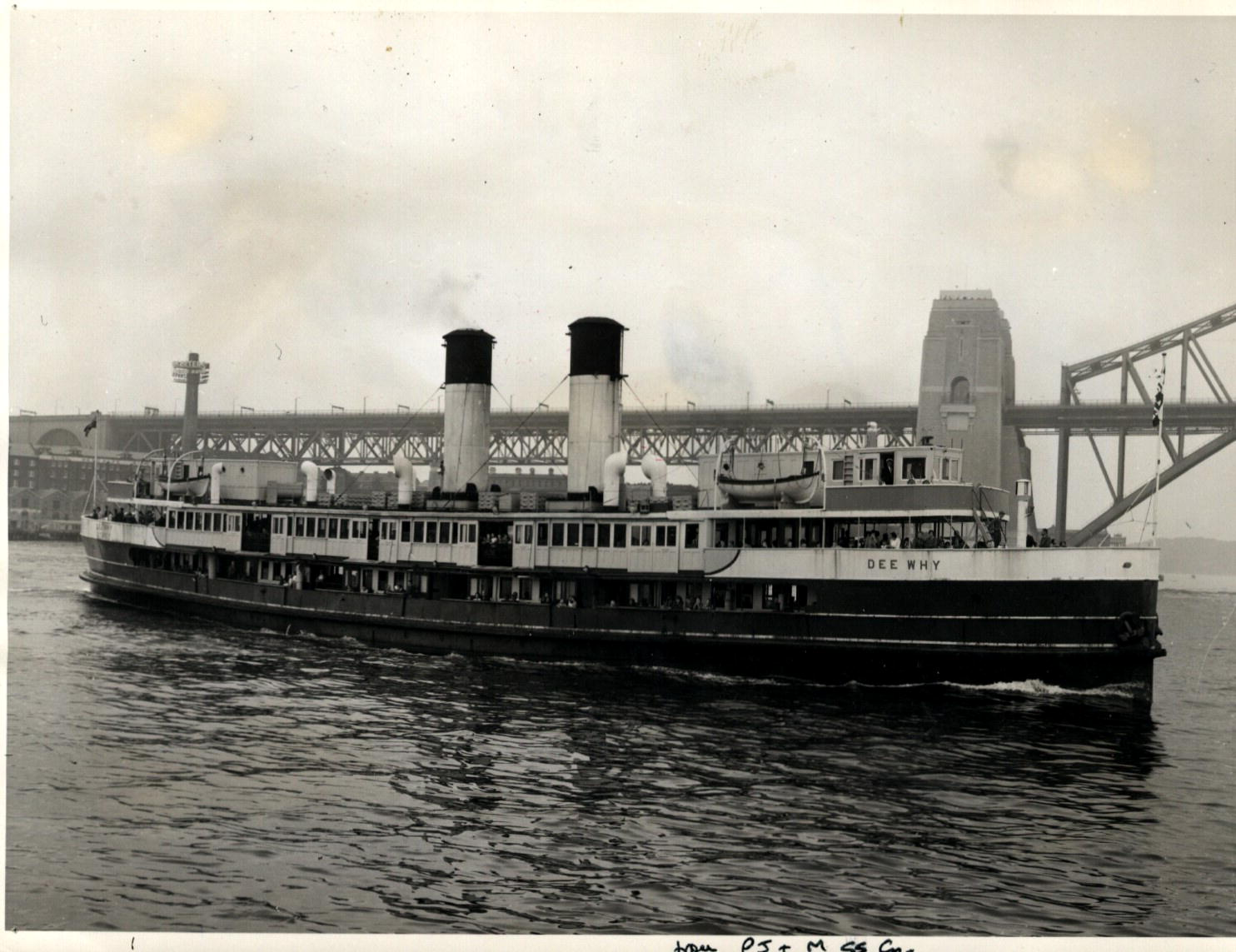
Dee Why leaving Sydney Cove, late 1950s

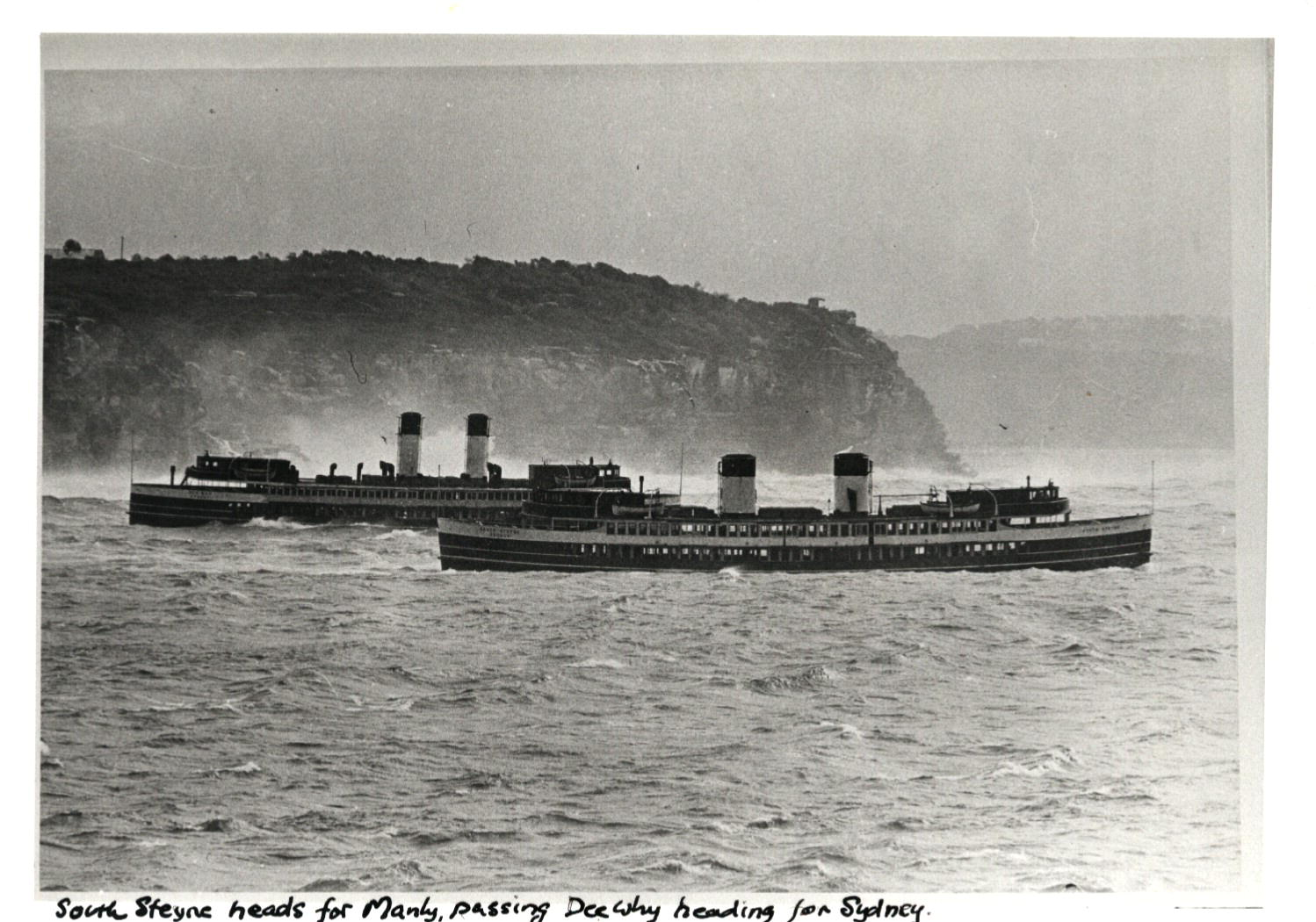
Dee Why (left) passes South Steyne at the Sydney Heads, early 1960s

== Incidents ==
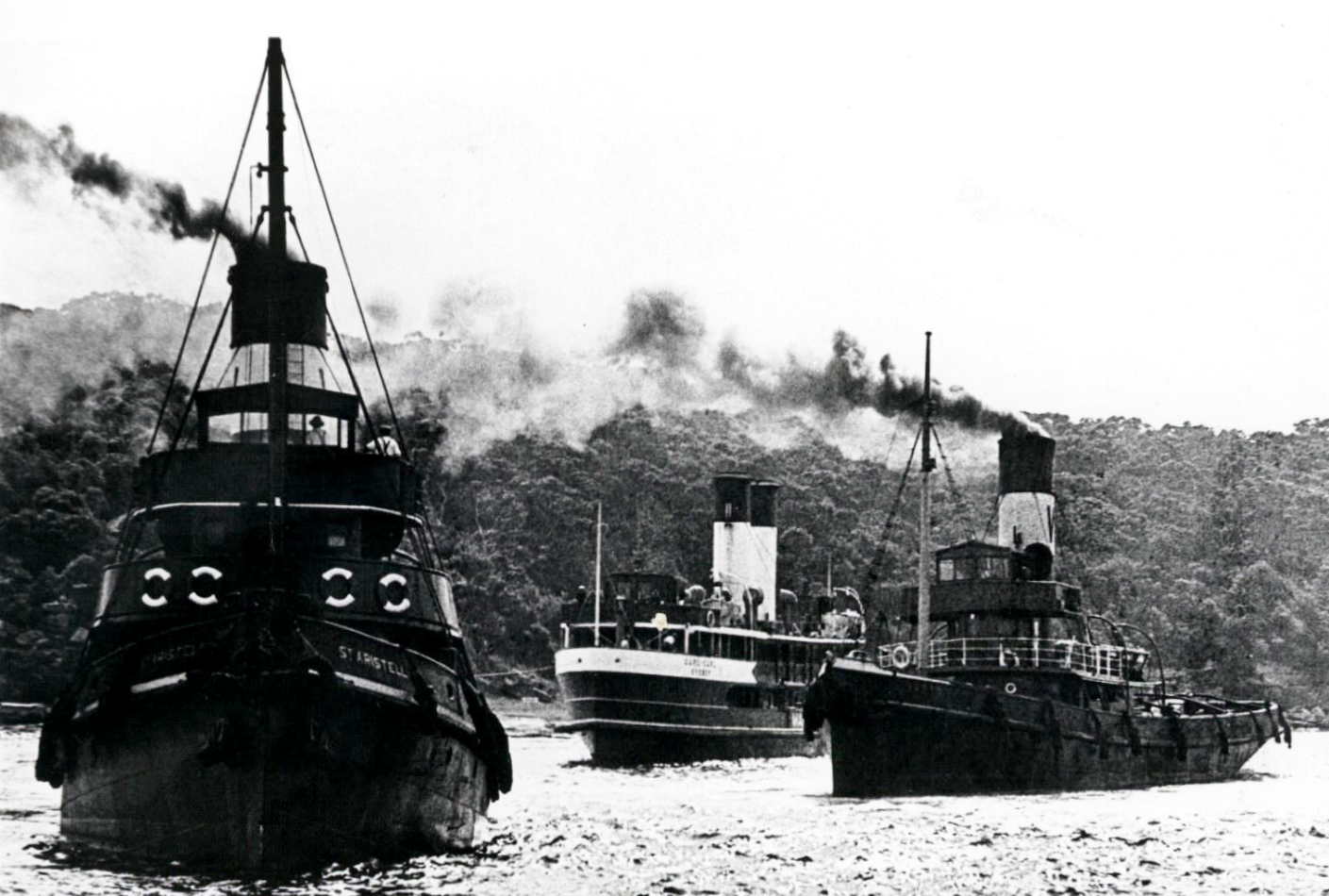
Curl Curl ran aground at Bradleys Head in thick fog, 1936. Tugs St Aristel and Lindfield pulled her off.

The two ferries lead largely safe and quiet careers on the harbour; however, they had their fair share of incidents:

=== Dee Why ===
- On 25 November 1931, had her first accident when she rammed the wooden Sydney Ferries Limited ferry, Kirrule. The Dee Why's captain was found to be at fault and his certificate was suspended.
- 1 October 1943, collided with a liberty ship.
- On Christmas Day night, 1946, ran aground in fog at Obelisk Bay, and remained stuck for several hours while the wharfingers at Manly were wondering where she had got to—in those days there was no radio on board—and was nearly eight hours late when she was towed off by three tugs after the fog had lifted and people realised what happened. She had lost her rudder, damaged her propeller, and bent hull frames. Repairs to the ferry cost £6,500, and most of the travellers had to wait through the small hours of the morning before being lifted off.
- 29 March 1957, collided with tug Himma, and ran aground at Kirribilli.

=== Curl Curl ===
- On 29 April 1929, Curl Curl, ran down a passenger launch named Nimrod which heeled over throwing a number of her passengers into the water. No-one was seriously injured and the boats were not significantly damaged.
- On 30 April 1930, Curl Curl collided with Sydney Ferries Limited ferry, Kiandra. The Curl Curl, being constructed of steel, caused serious damage to the wooden Kiandra, and it was only by prompt action by emergency crews that she avoided sinking. Several people were injured.
- In February 1932, Curl Curl failed to stop at Manly wharf and rammed the footpath and Manly pool. Divers were needed to clear a rope that had wrapped round the propeller.
- 31 March 1936, on a 7:10 am service from Circular Quay, Curl Curl ran aground at Bradleys Head in fog with 50 people aboard. All passengers were safely transferred to launch Nevade. Tugs St Aristel and Lindfield pulled her off later that afternoon. After damage to her rudder and propeller blades was repaired, she was returned to service on 9 April 1936.
- On 16 November 1936, suffered blistered paint but avoided major damage when she was towed away by police launch from the burning Bellubera at the company's Kurraba Point depot. The fire destroyed Bellubera's superstructure, killed two crew members and injured two others, one critically. Bellubera's hull and engine survived and she was later rebuilt.
- 10 November 1938, collided with Manly Wharf
- 23 September 1943, collided with launch
- 12 February 1953, collision with Manly Wharf causing significant damage to herself, to the wharf and destroying the local tourism offices.
- 9 February 1954, collided with Lady Scott

== Demise ==
In 1960, PJ & MS Co financial circumstances had declined, and the Curl Curl was decommissioned on 25 October 1960 following Baragoola's recommissioning after being converted to diesel. Curl Curl was laid up at the Balmain depot where in 1962 she began popping rivets and leaking. She was sold in 1963 to Strides & Co shipbreakers. The stripped hulk was towed out of the harbour where she was scuttled on 12 August 1969.

The Dee Why continued alone and her last three years were as a relief vessel. Her final run was on 7 July 1968 under Captain K Ross. She too was decommissioned and sold to Strides where she was laid up next to the hulk of Curl Curl. One of her wheelhouses was taken to Warringah Mall and used as a children's playhouse for a few years. Dee Why was towed out of the harbour on 25 August 1976, by the tugs Rozelle and Fern Bay, to a point two-and-a-half nautical miles offshore and scuttled off Long Reef. Her remains lie in water 51 metres deep at 33°41′S 151°20′E, and forming an artificial fishing reef. Divers regularly dive the wreck.

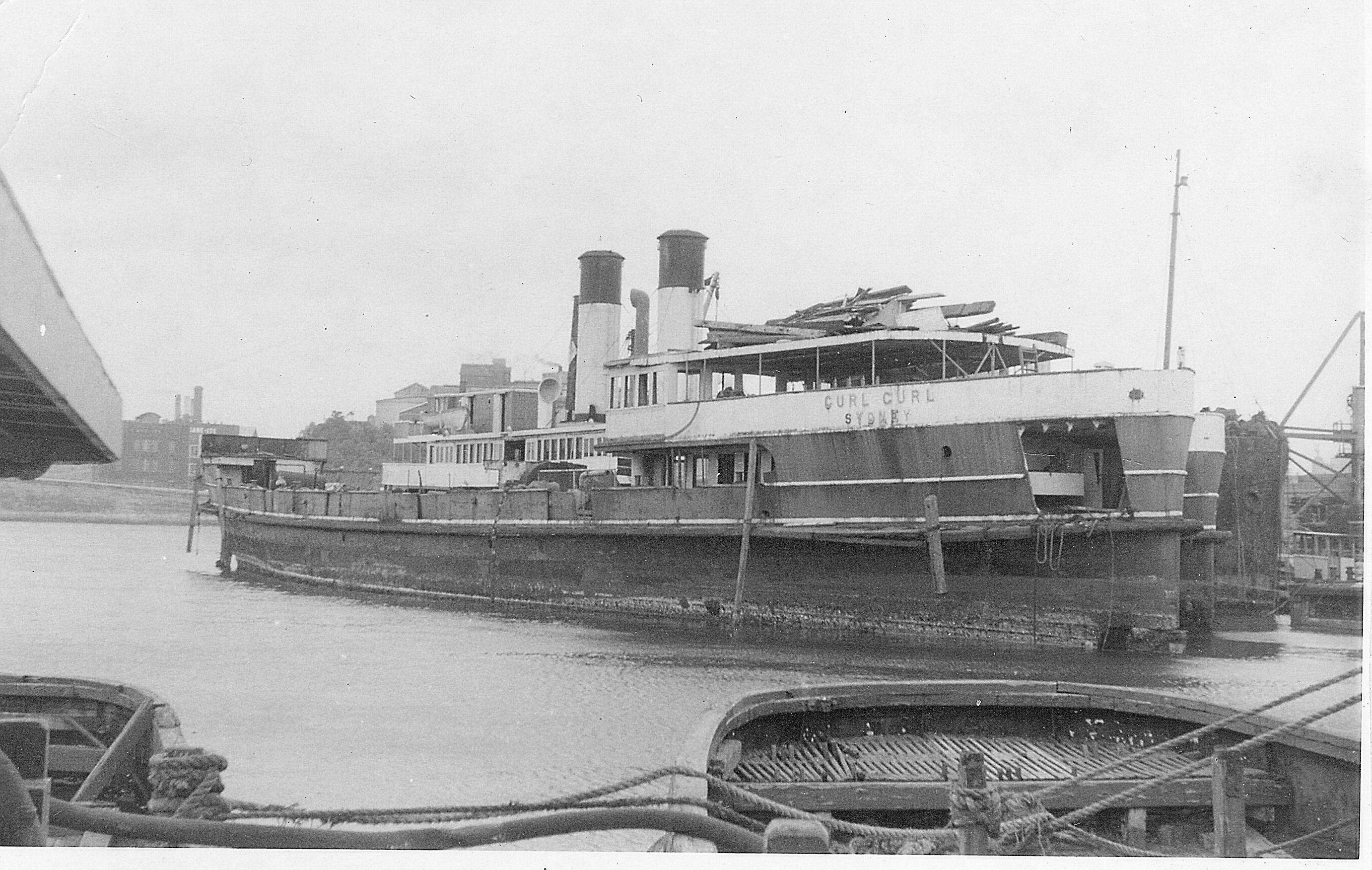
Curl Curl (hulked, front) and Dee Why at Strides shipbreakers, 1969

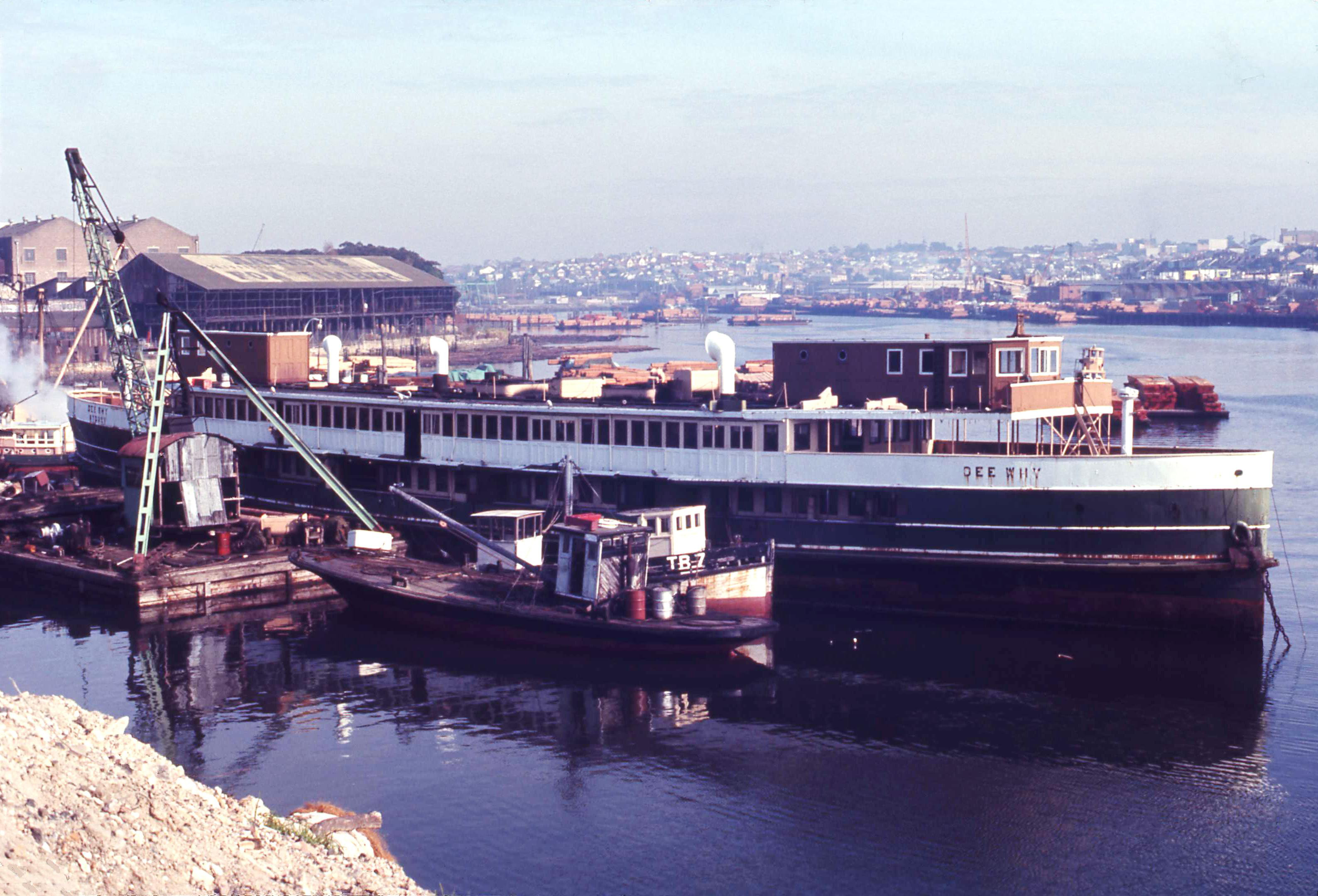
Dee Why being broke up, 1970s

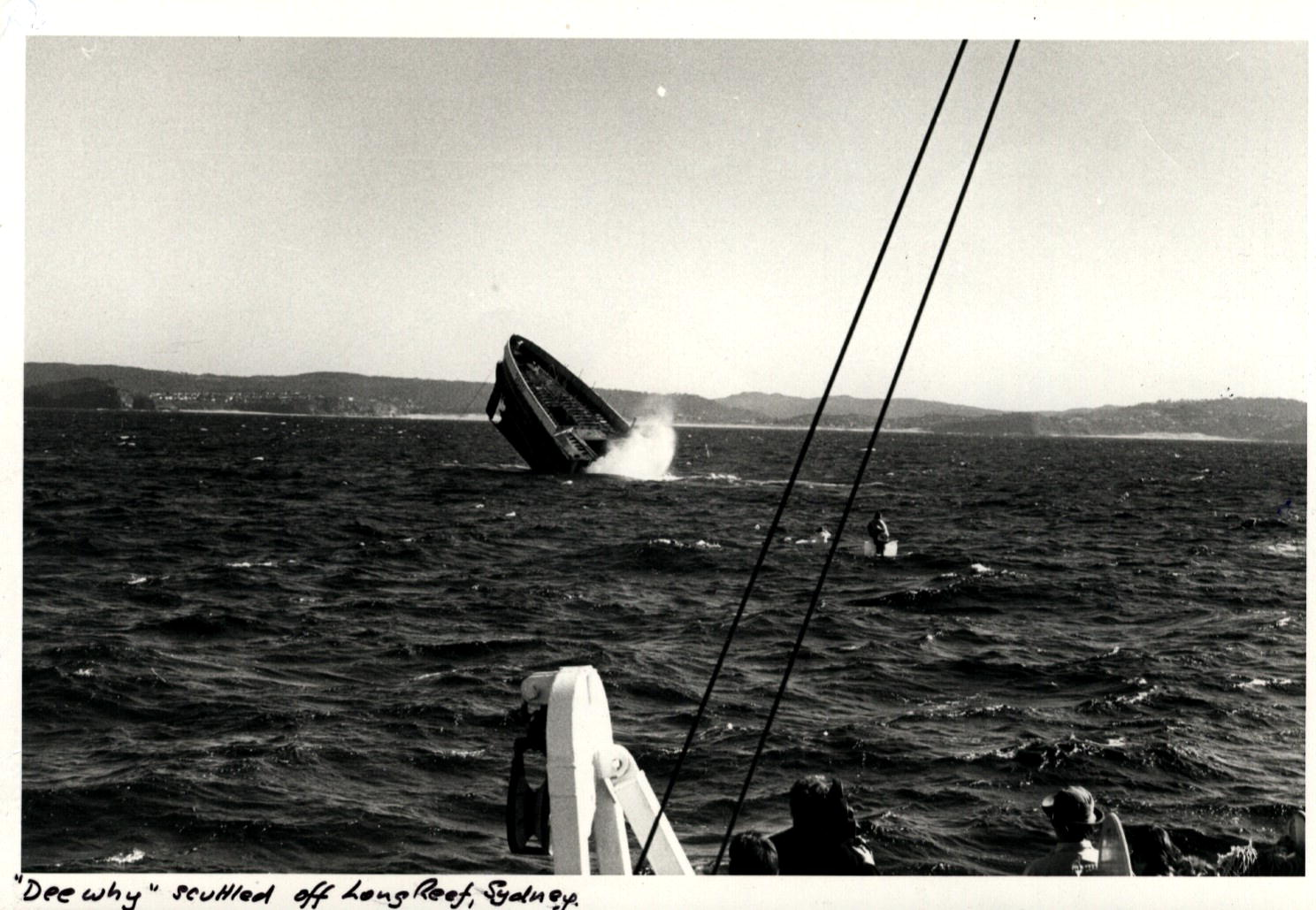
Dee Why scuttled off Long Reef

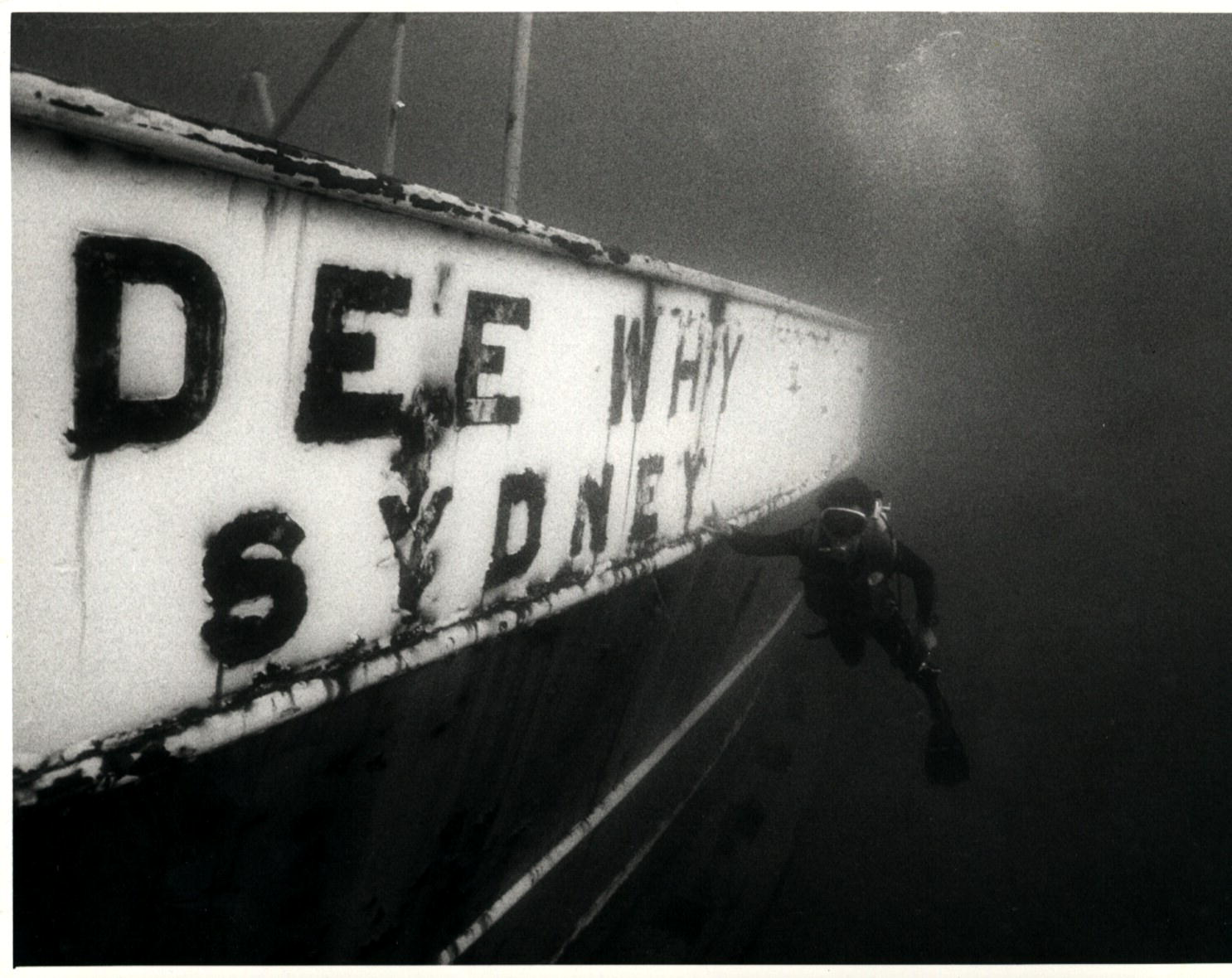
Dee Why on the ocean floor the after being scuttled, 1976

== See also ==
- List of Sydney Harbour ferries
- Timeline of Sydney Harbour ferries
