= Karingal (ferry) =

Australian ferry

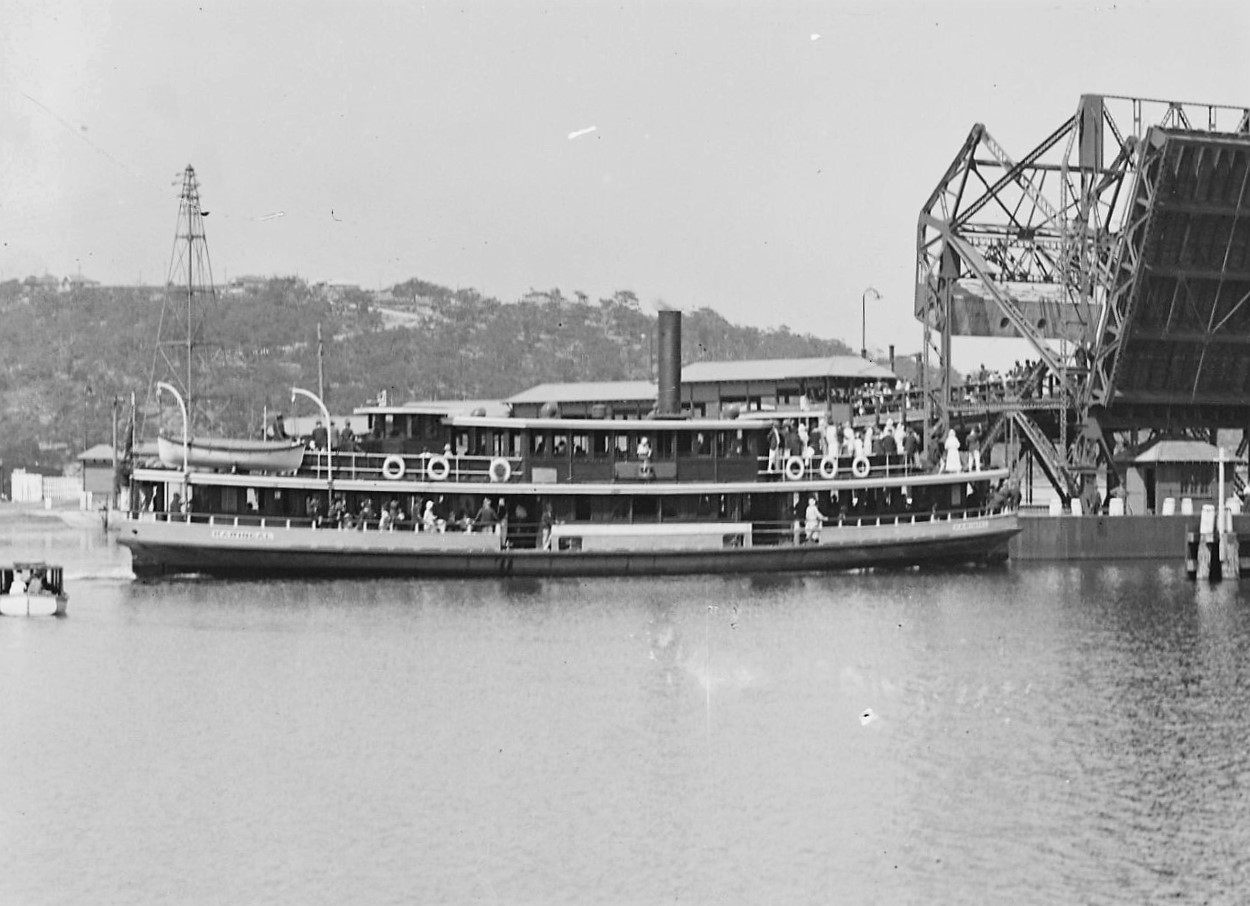
- Karingal passes through Spit Bridge, 1924

History
- Name: Karingal
- Operator: Sydney Ferries Limited; Sydney Harbour Transport Board; Public Transport Commission; Urban Transit Authority
- Port of registry: Sydney
- Builder: Morrison & Sinclair
- Cost: £7,726
- Launched: 1913
- Out of service: 1984
- Identification: O/N: 131565
- Fate: Sunk Bass Strait 1985

General characteristics
- Tonnage: 106 tons
- Length: 31.7 m
- Decks: 2
- Capacity: 608

Karingal was a ferry operated by Sydney Ferries Limited and its NSW State Government operated successors on Sydney Harbour from 1913 until 1984. A wooden ferry built at the time of Sydney Ferries' rapid early twentieth century, she was the smallest of the round-end "K-class ferries".

Karingal and her very similar "sister", Karrabee, were built as coal-fired steamer and converted to diesel in the 1930s. Unlike many early twentieth century Sydney Ferries, they survived both the opening of the Sydney Harbour Bridge in the 1930s and the State Government takeover in 1951.

Karingal, and the other three remaining old wooden ferries, were taken out of service shortly after Karrabee's high-profile sinking at Circular Quay in 1984. In service for 71 years, the two were among the longest-serving ferries on Sydney Harbour.

"Karingal" is an Australian Aboriginal word meaning 'happy home'.

== Background ==
Karingal, and her sister Karrabee, were built for Sydney Ferries Limited during the early twentieth century boom in cross-Harbour travel prior to the 1932 opening of the Sydney Harbour Bridge. At the time, the company ran one of the largest ferry fleets in the world. The two ferries were part of broader type of around 25 double-ended timber screw ferries - the Sydney K-class ferries - that the company commissioned between the 1890s and early 1920s to meet the booming demand.

Karingal followed the Sydney Ferries Limited convention of naming their vessels after Australian Aboriginal words starting with "K". "Karingal" is thought to mean "happy home".

== Design and construction ==
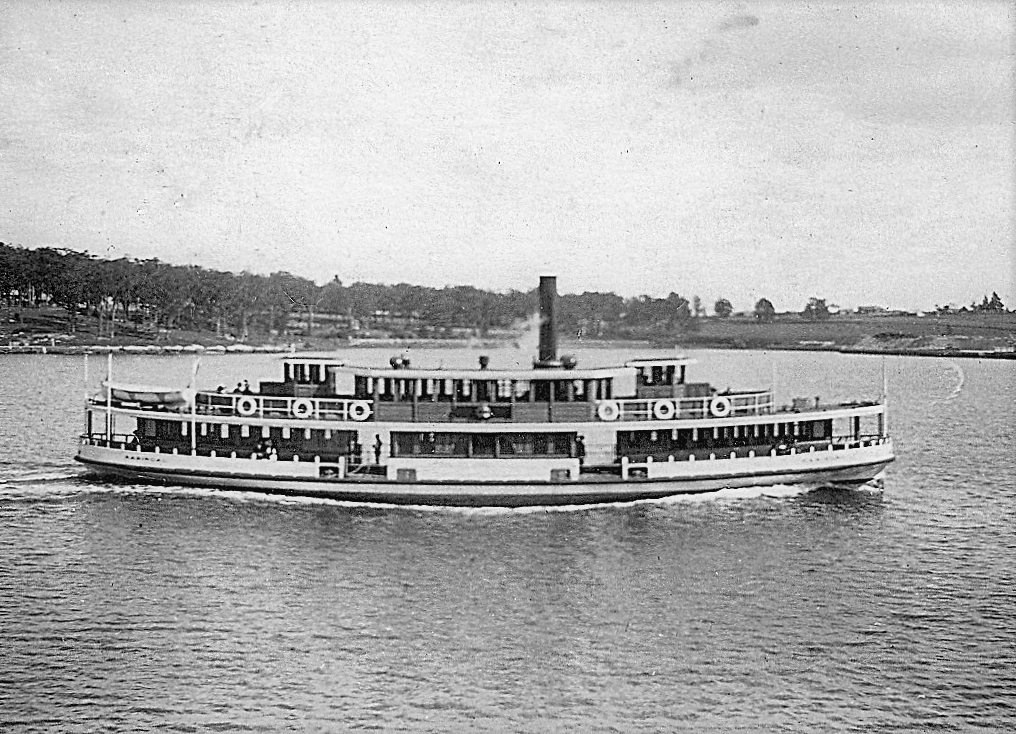
Karingal as built as a steamer in her original varnished timber with white trim livery

Karingal, and sister Karrabee, were built by Morrison & Sinclair, Balmain for Sydney Ferries Limited's Parramatta River service. Both carvel planked boats were designed by J Harter under the supervision of T Brown, the company's works manager. Karingal was the smallest of the round-ended K-class Sydney ferries, and could carry 608 passengers. The slightly larger, Karrabee could carry 653.

Karingal's original steam engine and boilers came from the ferry Aleathea (1881) when it was converted into a lighter in 1913. The Bow, McLachlan and Company-built 28 nhp, 260 iph engines had cyclinders of 13-inch, 26-inch and 18-inch. The engines were fitted by Poole and Steele and pushed Karingal at up to 11 knots. Unlike other Sydney Ferries Ltd vessels, she is pushed, or pulled depending on direction, by a single propeller at one end.

Karingal was launched on 8 April 1913. She was christened by Miss Duncan, daughter of the outdoor superintendent of the Sydney Ferries Ltd company.

Karingal's original cost was £7,726.

== Service history ==
=== Steam ferry (1913 - 1937) ===
Karingal's trial trip took place on 15 August 1913 during which she reached a speed of 11.5 knots. She commenced her passenger service on the Parramatta River route on 2 September 1913. The Parramatta River service beyond Gladesville Bridge was discontinued after 1928 and Karingal was used on other routes.

Karingal was kept in service after the 1932 opening of the Sydney Harbour Bridge whereas 18 mainly older vessels were decommissioned due to the drop in passenger demand. Prior to the bridge opening, Sydney Ferries Limited had transported 40 million passengers a year, however, this number dropped to 15 million after the opening. The drop in demand for the remaining ferry fleet, was somewhat mitigated as many could not afford their own transport in the Great Depression of the 1930s and rationing of fuel during World War 2 made the coal required for the steam ferries relatively cheap.

Steam ferry (1913 - 1937)
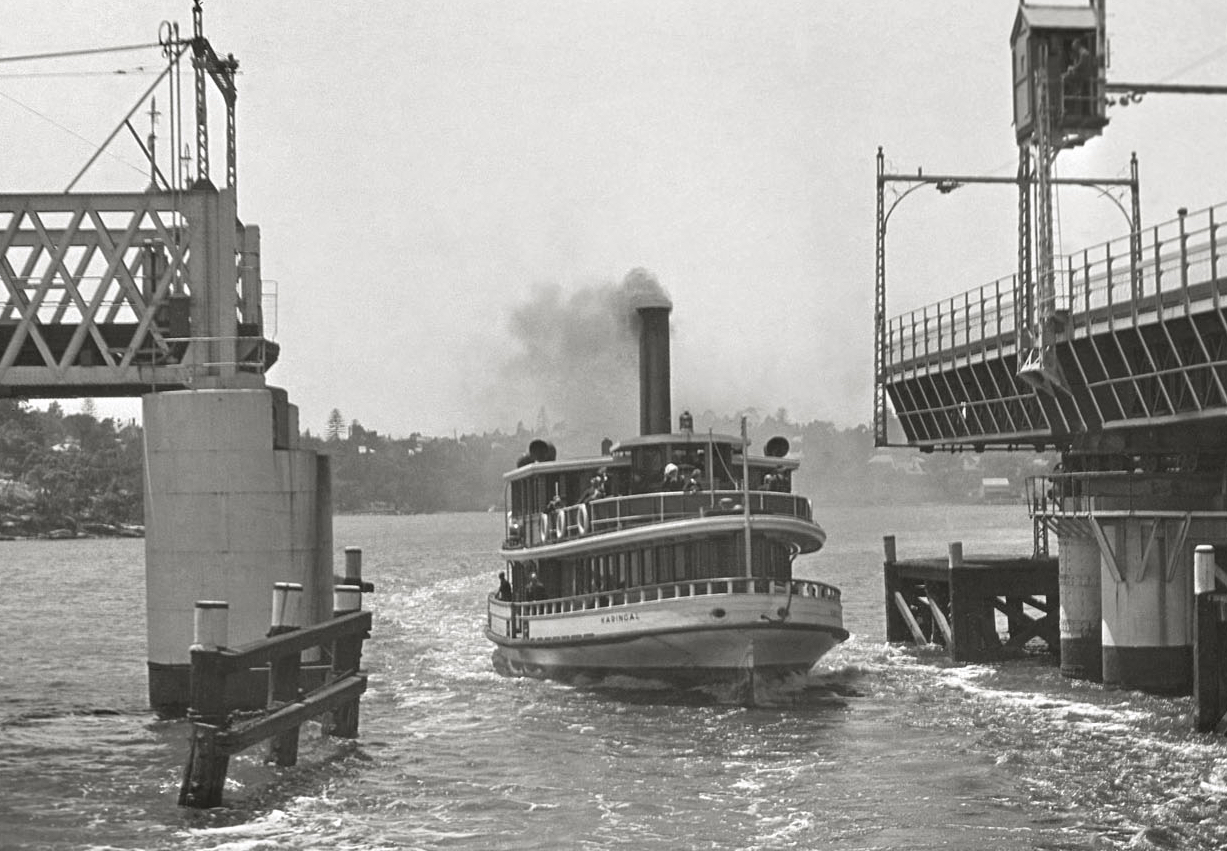
Karingal passing through Gladesville Bridge in the years prior to her conversion to diesel

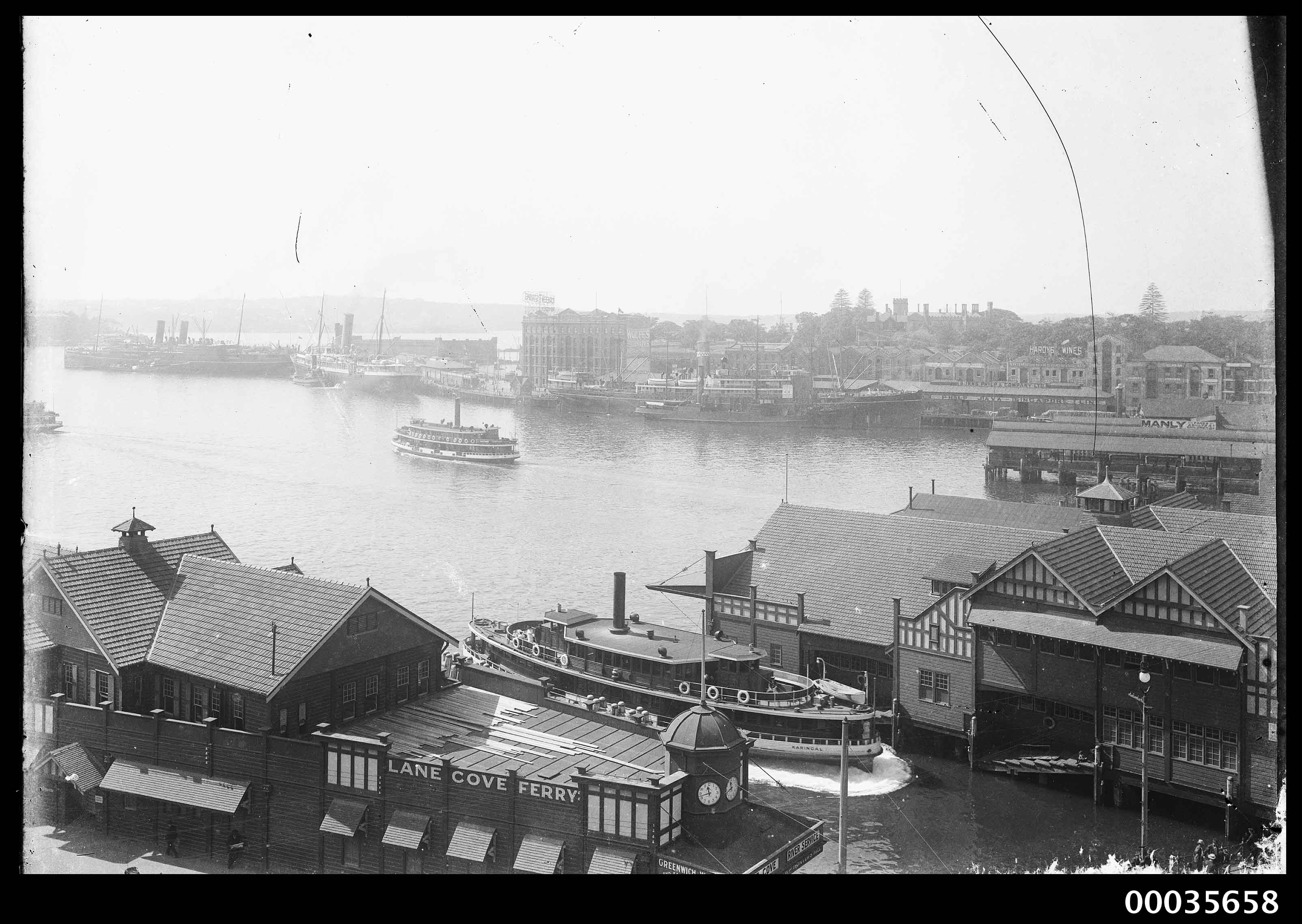
Karingal at Circular Quay, early 20th century

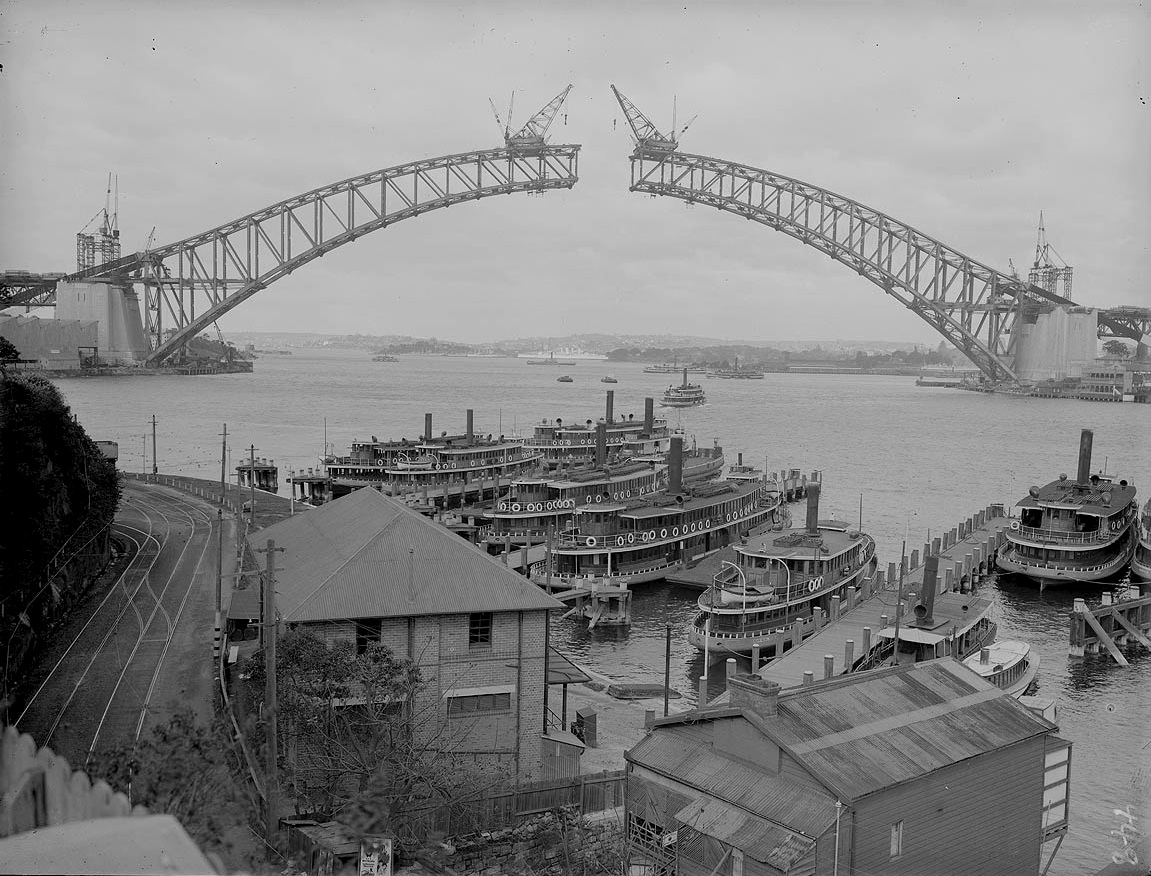
Karingal (near) with other K-class ferries, of which she was the smallest

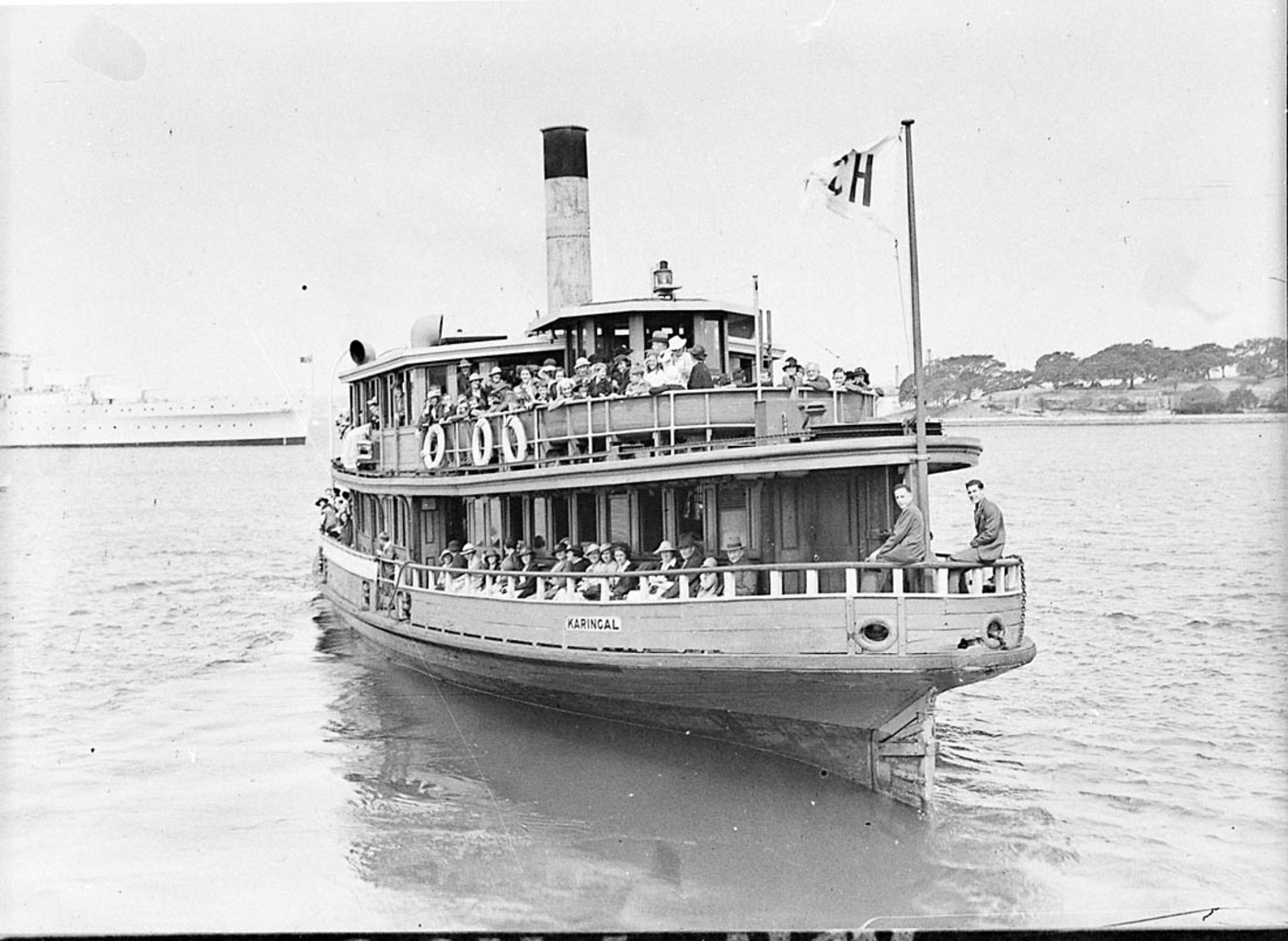
In her last year as a steamer with updated yellow and green painted livery

=== Diesel vessel (1937 - 1984) ===
In 1937, Karingal was converted from steam to diesel-electric power. The new six-cylinder Henty and Gardner diesel engines, supplied by Ferrier & Dickenson, generated 300 bhp @ 290 rpm and gave her a speed of nine knots. A direct drive to a single screw set-up, with air start & air reversing 365lb, and Gardner 2-stage air compressor. The conversion from steam to diesel saw her tall funnel replaced with a short tapered funnel. In a modernisation drive, Sydney Ferries Limited painted their fleet, including Karingal, a yellow and green colour scheme over the originally varnished timber superstructure.

In 1951, as post-war demand for ferry services dropped further to 9 million, the NSW State Government took over Sydney Ferries Limited and its remaining fleet and assets. The Port Jackson and Manly Steamship Company, which ran the Manly service, was paid to run the services. On the day of ownership transfer, Karingal began her pre-midnight trip to Mosman as a privately owned Sydney Ferries Limited vessel, and returned to Circular Quay after midnight as a government-run ferry. The services and fleet were quickly rationalised with most of the larger remaining timber K-class steamers being decommissioned.

Karingal was re-engined in 1961 with a 440bhp@300rpm 6Cy.10½"-13½" 2SA Crossley Brothers HRM6 diesel. Other specifications included auxiliaries of Gardner 4SA diesel driving generator plus clutch operated Jabsco general service pump & auxiliary compressor. Engine room bilge pump and sanitary pump driven from intermediate shaft. Semi-rotary hand pump on main deck for bilge and fire, and electric steering. The new engines returned her to her original 11 knots that she achieved as a steamer.

In 1966, the Sydney Ferry Company used Karingal and Karrabee on a weekend and holiday service from Circular Quay to Watsons Bay, however, despite initial success, the service ceased due to lack of passengers. In 1980, Karingal competed in the inaugural Great Ferry Race as part of the Festival of Sydney. Other entrants were the Lady Wakehurst, Kanangra, Lady Cutler, Karrabee, and the winner, Lady Woodward.

Diesel vessel (1937 - 1984)
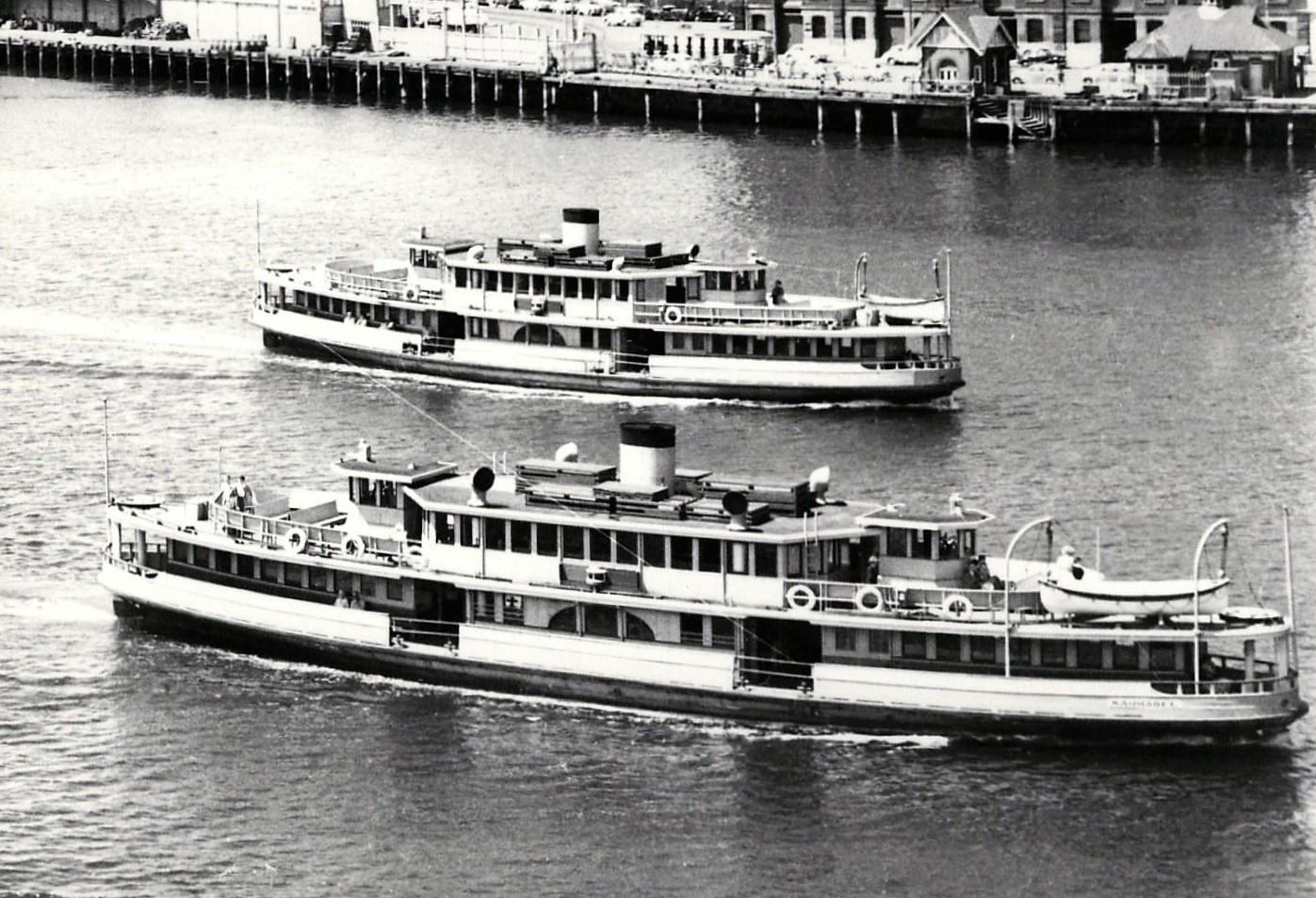
"Sisters" Karrabee (near) and Karingal in Sydney Cove, 1950s.

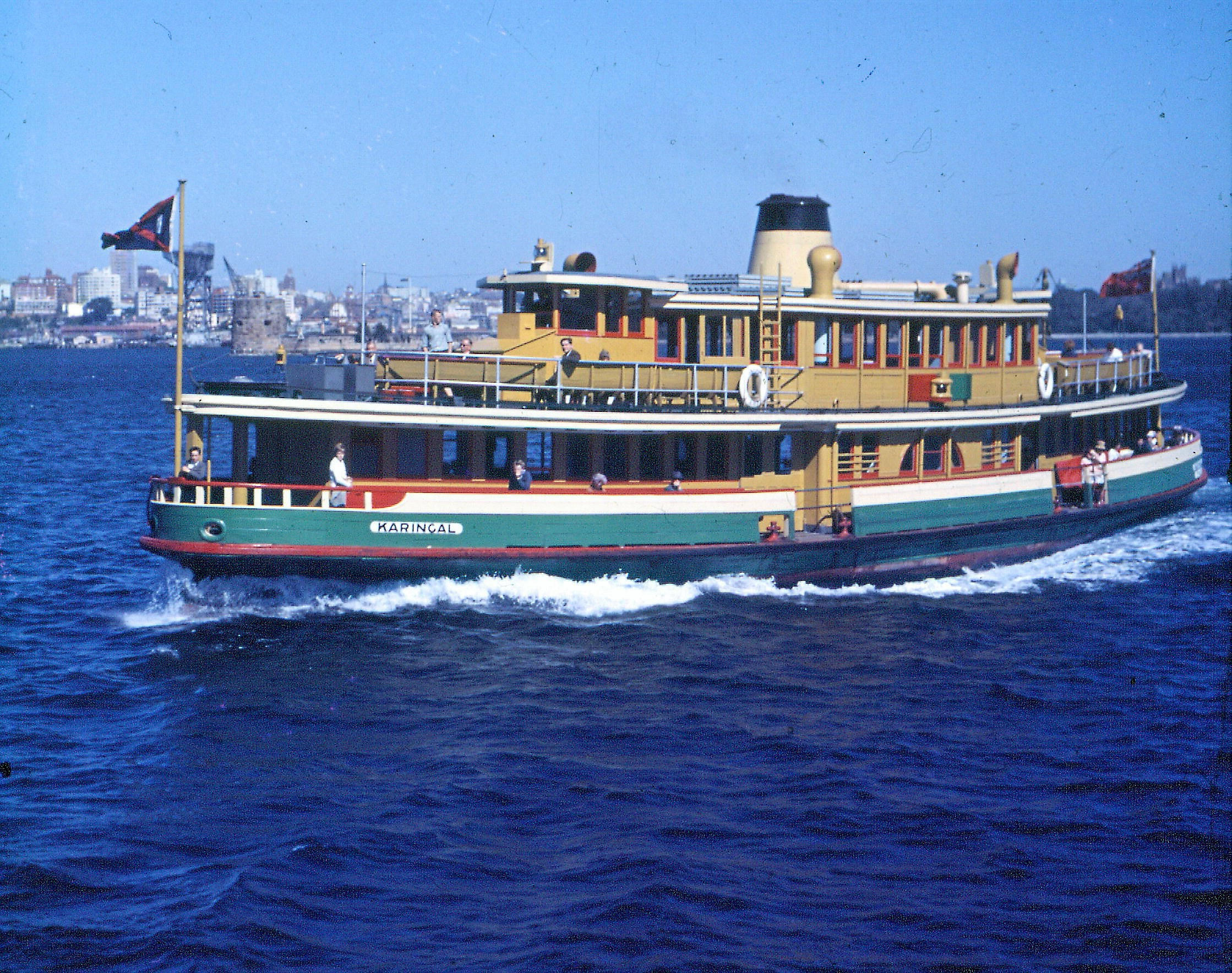
Her Sydney Ferries Limited post-bridge colours, 1962

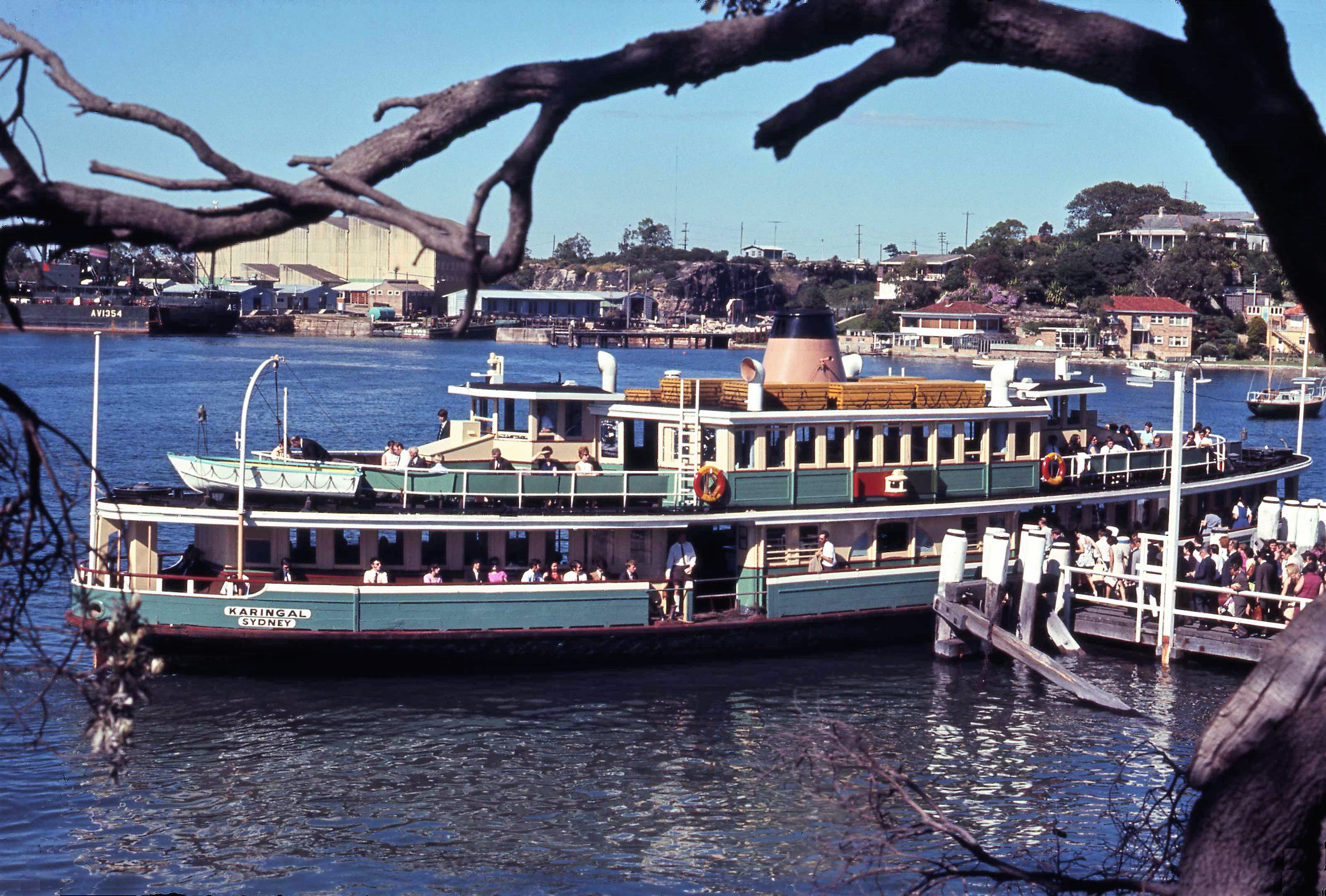
At Valentia Street Wharf in her Sydney Harbour Transport Board colours.

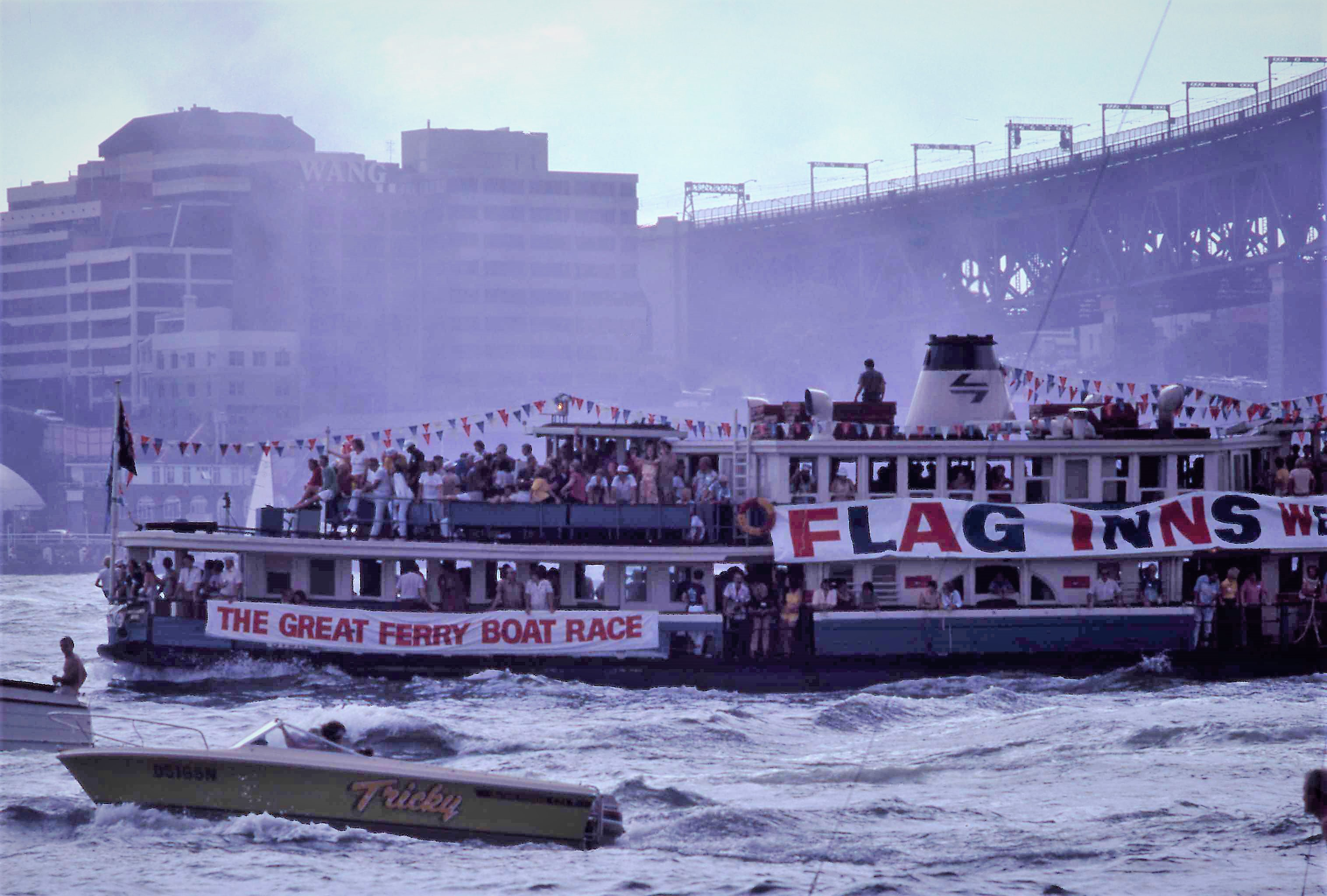
Competing in the inaugural Great Ferry Boat Race in her Public Transport Commission colours, 1980

== Incidents ==
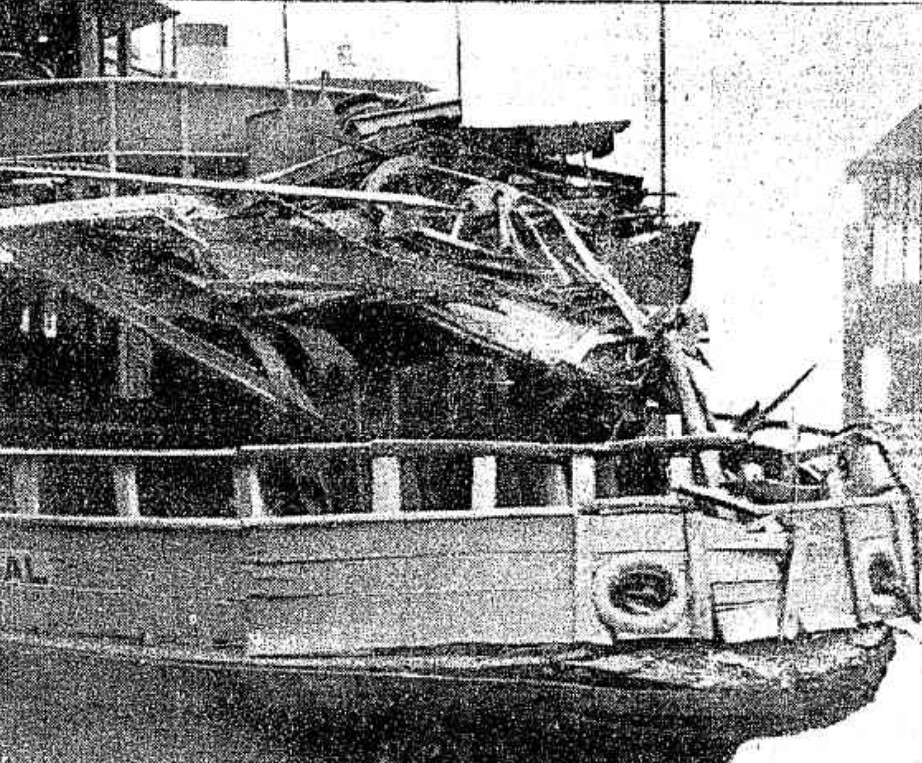
Karingal after collision with freight in 1947

- 27 July 1937 - Karingal ran aground in the Lane Cove River near Valentine Street Wharf. Lady Scott took her passengers and towed into deeper water.
- 15 July 1944 - After failing to stop at Mosman Wharf, strong winds pushed Karingal into a group of nearby moored cruisers and launches, with all the boats going aground against the stone sea wall. She was towed off by a tug an hour later.
- 16 May 1947 - In thick fog, Karingal crashed into a freighter moored at Walsh Bay causing significant damage to her upper deck and canopy. No-one was injured and passengers were taken to Circular Quay.
- 30 January 1950 - She broke down on a trip between Circular Quay Neilsen Park with about 400 passengers on board. They were transferred passengers to Kurra-ba, and the ferry was towed back to Circular Quay by ferry Lady Chelmsford. A faulty air valve had been found to have blown out.
- 19 March 1951 - Karingal collided head on with Lady Denman, ripping out a length of Lady Denman's bulwarks.
- 16 October 1954 - A fire broke out in the exhaust manifold of the main engine filling the cabin with smoke. The crew prepared to evacuate the passengers to nearby ferry Kanangra, however, she was rushed to Circular Quay where the fire was brought under control. No-one was injured, however, the engine, woodwork around the engine room and sun deck life rafts were damaged.

== Retirement and demise ==
The remaining wooden ferries on Sydney Harbour - Lady Edeline, Kameruka, and Karingal - were taken out of service following Karrabee’s 1984 sinking and the commissioning of the first of the First Fleet catamaran ferries in 1984.

Karingal was sold to new owners in Melbourne. On her delivery voyage to Melbourne, she sprang a leak in heavy seas and sank on 14 June 1985 off Cape Conron on Victoria's south east coast. It is thought she may have struck a semi-submerged container. The seven crew members were rescued by helicopter.

== See also ==
- List of Sydney Harbour ferries
- Timeline of Sydney Harbour ferries
