= Karrabee =

1913 Sydney ferry

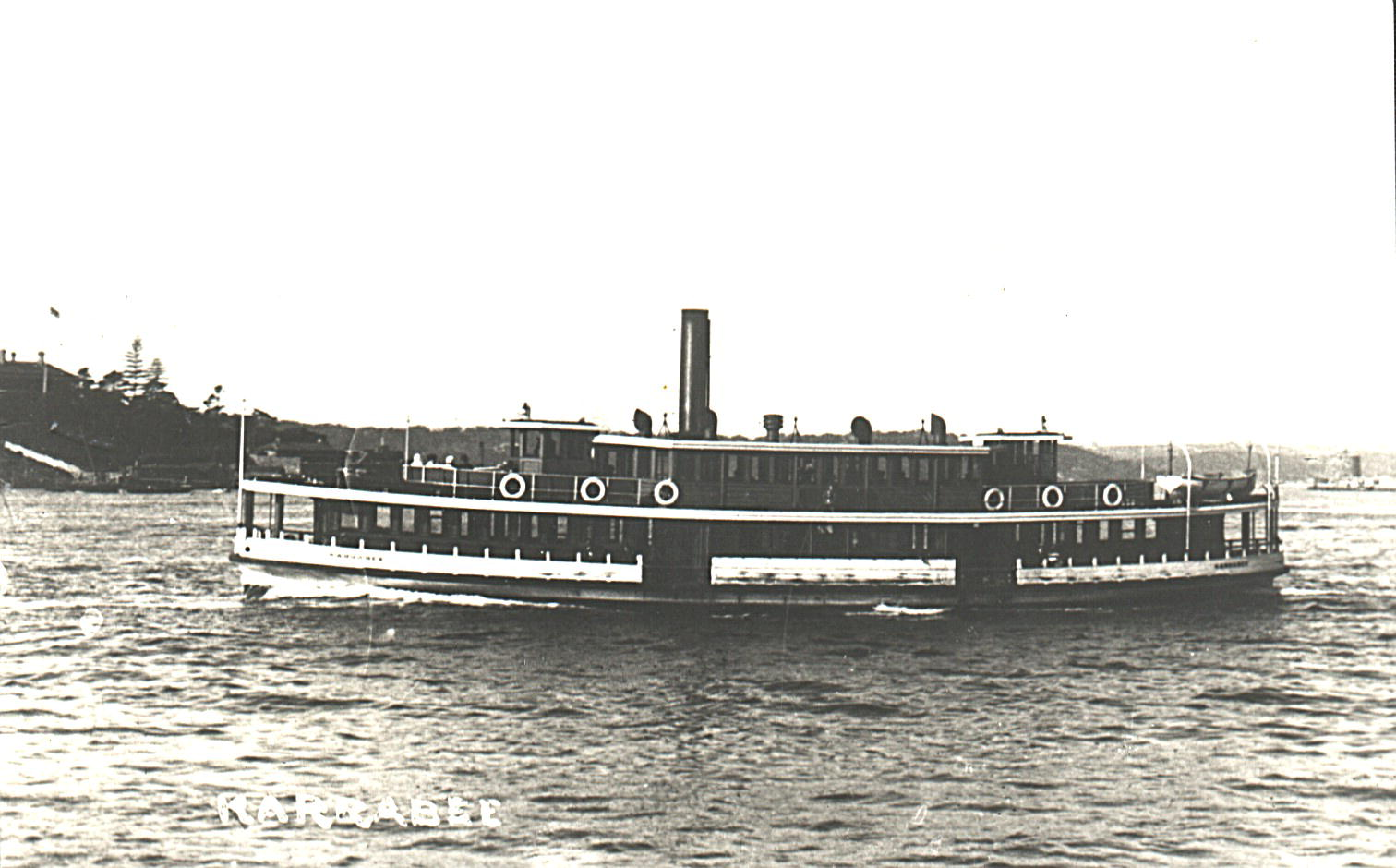
- Karrabee as built as a steamer

History
- Name: Karrabee
- Operator: Sydney Ferries Limited; Sydney Harbour Transport Board; Public Transport Commission; Urban Transit Authority
- Port of registry: Sydney
- Builder: Morrison & Sinclair
- Cost: £8,423
- Launched: 1913
- Out of service: Karrabee: 22 January 1984,
- Fate: Broken up November 2005

General characteristics
- Tonnage: 107 tons
- Length: 32.8 m
- Decks: 2
- Capacity: 653

Karrabee was a ferry operated by Sydney Ferries Limited and its NSW State Government operated successors on Sydney Harbour from 1913 until 1984. A wooden ferry built at the time of Sydney Ferries' rapid early twentieth century, she and near "sister", Karingal, were the smallest of the fleet of round-end "K-class ferries".

The ferries were built as coal-fired steamer and were converted to diesel in the 1930s. Unlike many early twentieth century Sydney Ferries, they survived the opening of the Sydney Harbour Bridge in the 1930s, and the State Government takeover in 1951.

Karrabee sank at Circular Quay after taking on water during the Great Ferry Race in 1984 - an incident that received extensive media coverage - and did not return to service. The three remaining old wooden ferries were taken out of service shortly after Karrabee's sinking. In service for 71 years, she was among the longest-serving ferries on Sydney Harbour, and after use in Gosford as a floating restaurant, she was broken up in 2005.

"Karrabee" is an Australian Aboriginal word meaning and 'cockatoo'.

== Design and construction ==
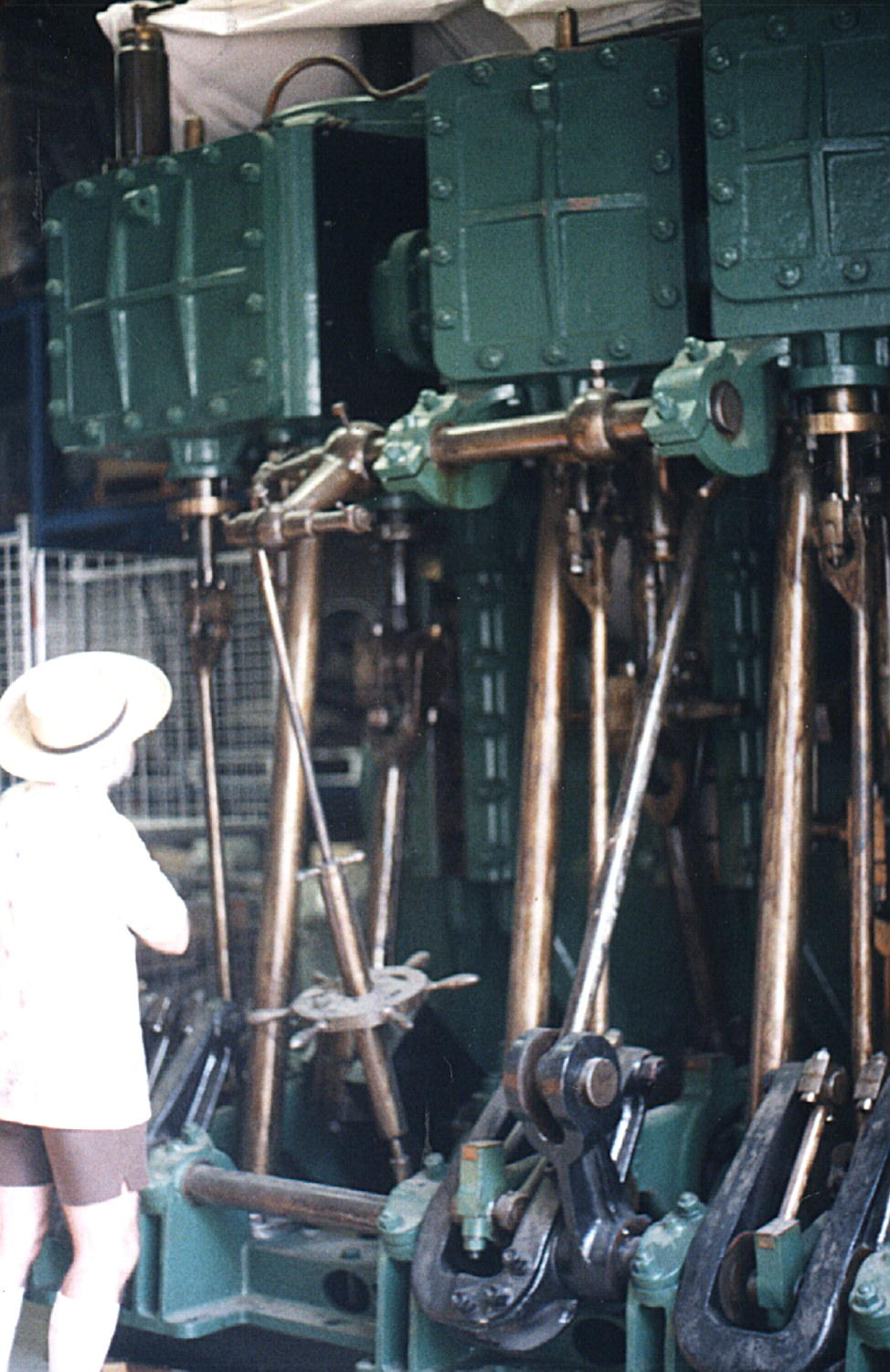
Karrabee's original steam engines now stored at the Powerhouse Museum

Intended for Sydney Ferries Limited's Parramatta River service, Karrabee, and her sister, Karingal, were built by Morrison & Sinclair, Balmain. Karrabee's hull was launched on 18 October 1913.

Both ferries were designed by J Harter under the supervision of T Brown, the company's works manager. Karrabee could carry 653 passengers.

Karrabee's original Hawthorn Leslie and Company-built steam engines were sourced from Pheasant (1887), the second biggest Parramatta River single-ended ferry and Sydney's triple-expansion steam ferry. The 36 hp steam engines could push Karrabee at up to 11 knots and are currently in the custody of the Powerhouse Museum.

Karabee's original cost was £8,423.

== Service history ==
Karrabee was kept in service after the 1932 opening of the Sydney Harbour Bridge whereas 18 mainly older vessels were decommissioned due to the drop in passenger demand. Prior to the bridge opening, Sydney Ferries Limited had transported 40 million passengers a year, however, this number dropped to 15 million after the opening. The drop in demand for the remaining ferry fleet, was somewhat mitigated as many could not afford their own transport in the Great Depression of the 1930s and rationing of fuel during World War 2 made the coal required for the steam ferries relatively cheap.

In 1936, Karrabee was converted from steam to diesel-electric power. The new six-cylinder Henty and Gardner diesel engines generated 440 bhp and gave her a speed of nine knots. She was re-engined in 1958 with a six-cylinder Crossley Brothers diesel, which provided 450 bhp and a top speed of 11 knots. The conversion from steam to diesel saw her tall funnel replaced with a short stout funnel.

In 1951, as post-war demand for ferry services dropped further to nine million, the NSW State Government took over Sydney Ferries Limited and its remaining fleet and assets. The Port Jackson and Manly Steamship Company, which ran the Manly service, was paid to run the services. The services and fleet were quickly rationalised with most of the larger remaining timber K-class steamers being decommissioned.

In the 1950s, Karrabee was painted red, white and blue and used as a floating promotion for Armed Forces recruitment. In 1966, the Sydney Ferry Company used Karingal and Karrabee on a weekend and holiday service from Circular Quay to Watsons Bay, however, despite initial success, the service ceased due to lack of passengers.

For most of her service life, Karrabee had only a few minor incidents. She collided with Kameruka in 1951 and with the smaller Radar in 1979. In 1975, she failed to stop at Circular Quay and rammed the concrete seawall.

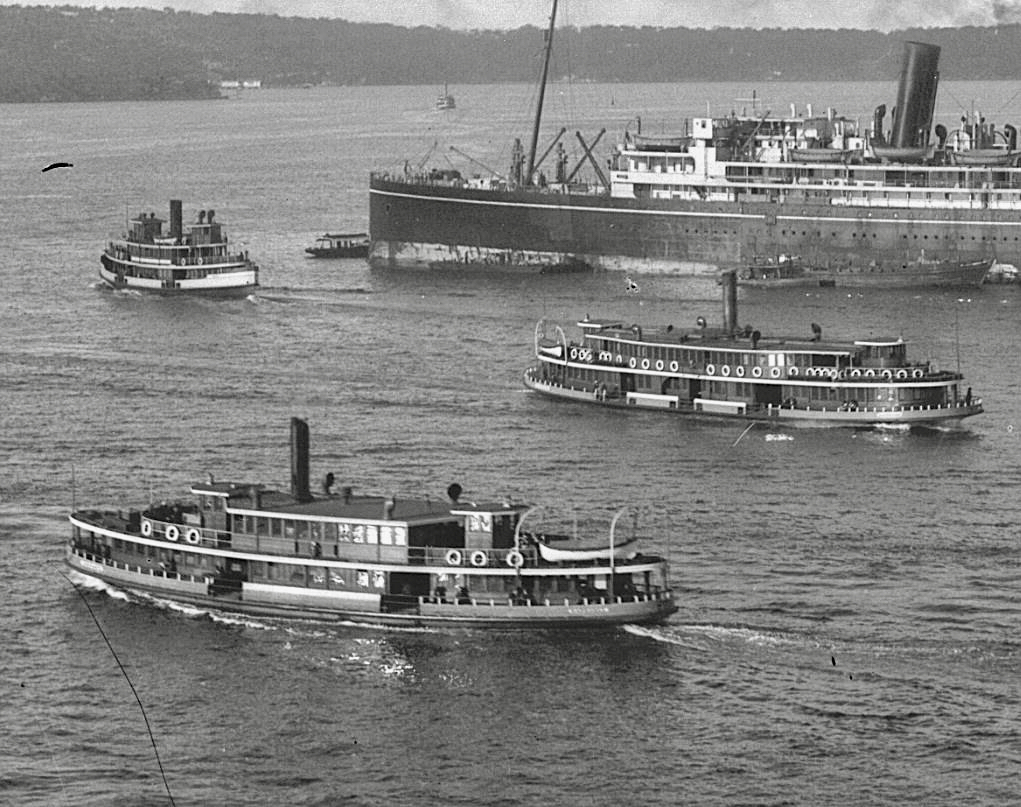
In the 1920s leaving Circular Quay

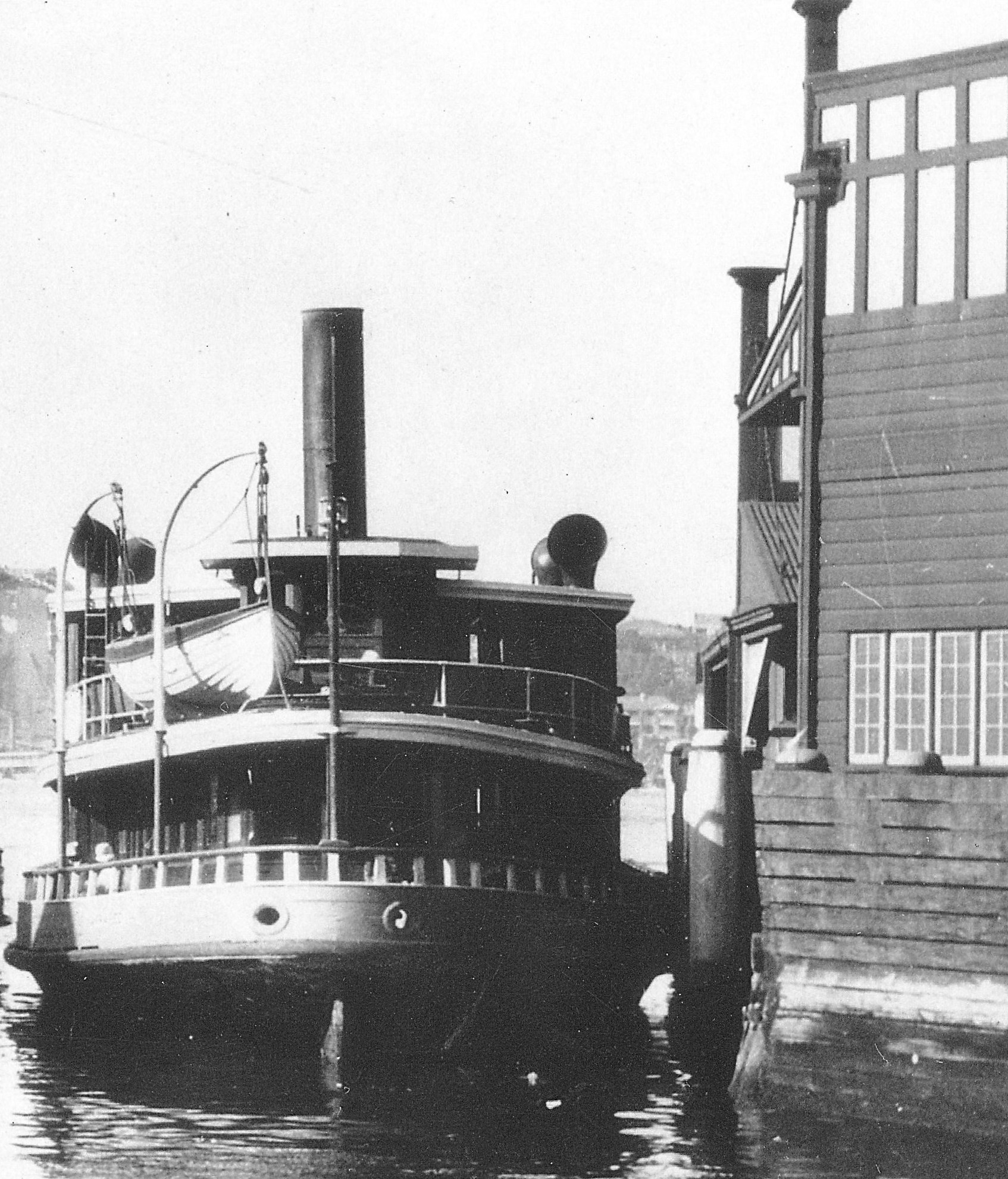
At Circular Quay circa 1930

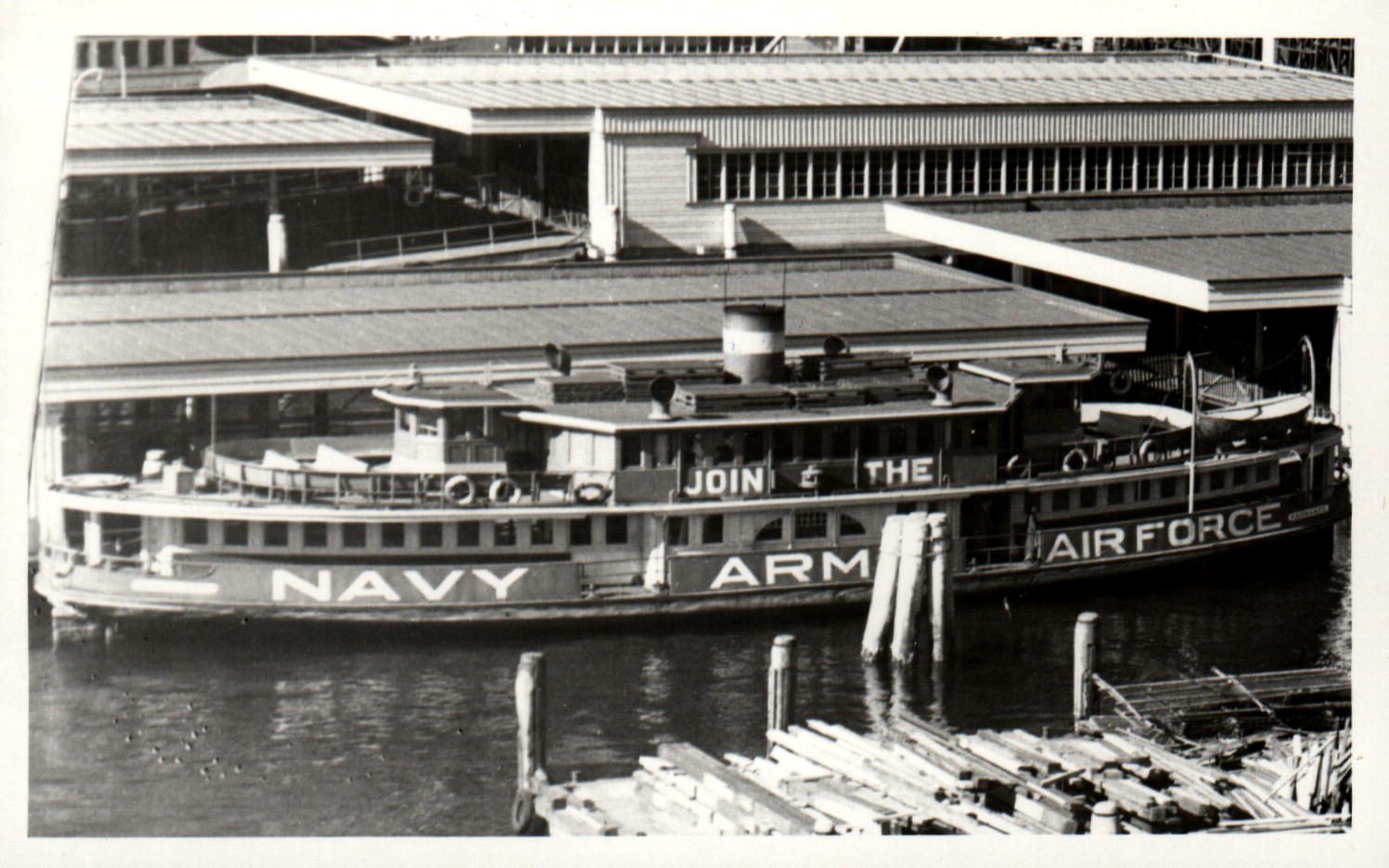
Karrabee with armed forces recruitment advertising.

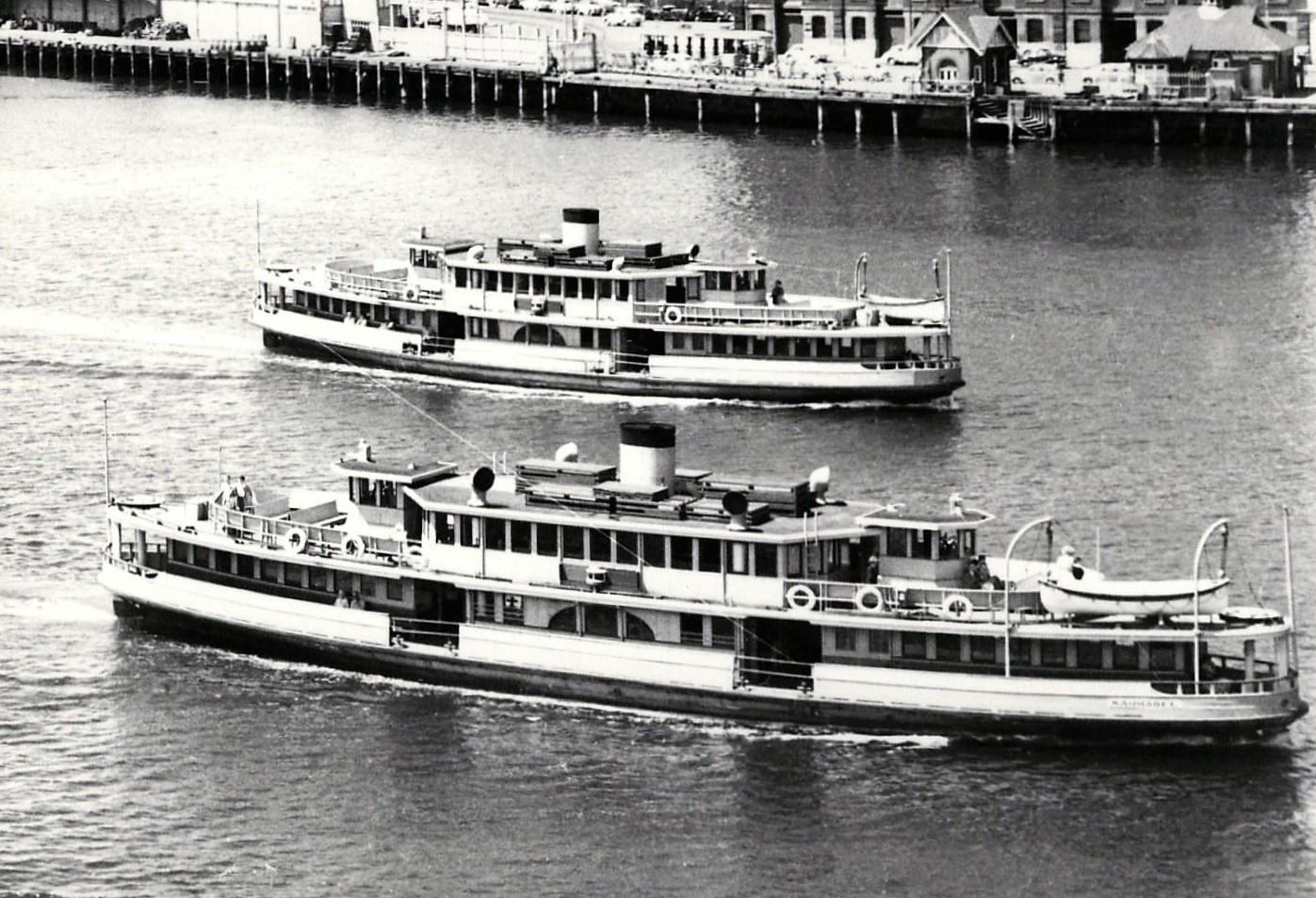
Karrabee (front) and sister Karingal as diesel vessels. The larger Karrabee had 13 windows along the top deck, in comparison to 11 on Karingal

=== 1984 Great Ferry Boat Race ===
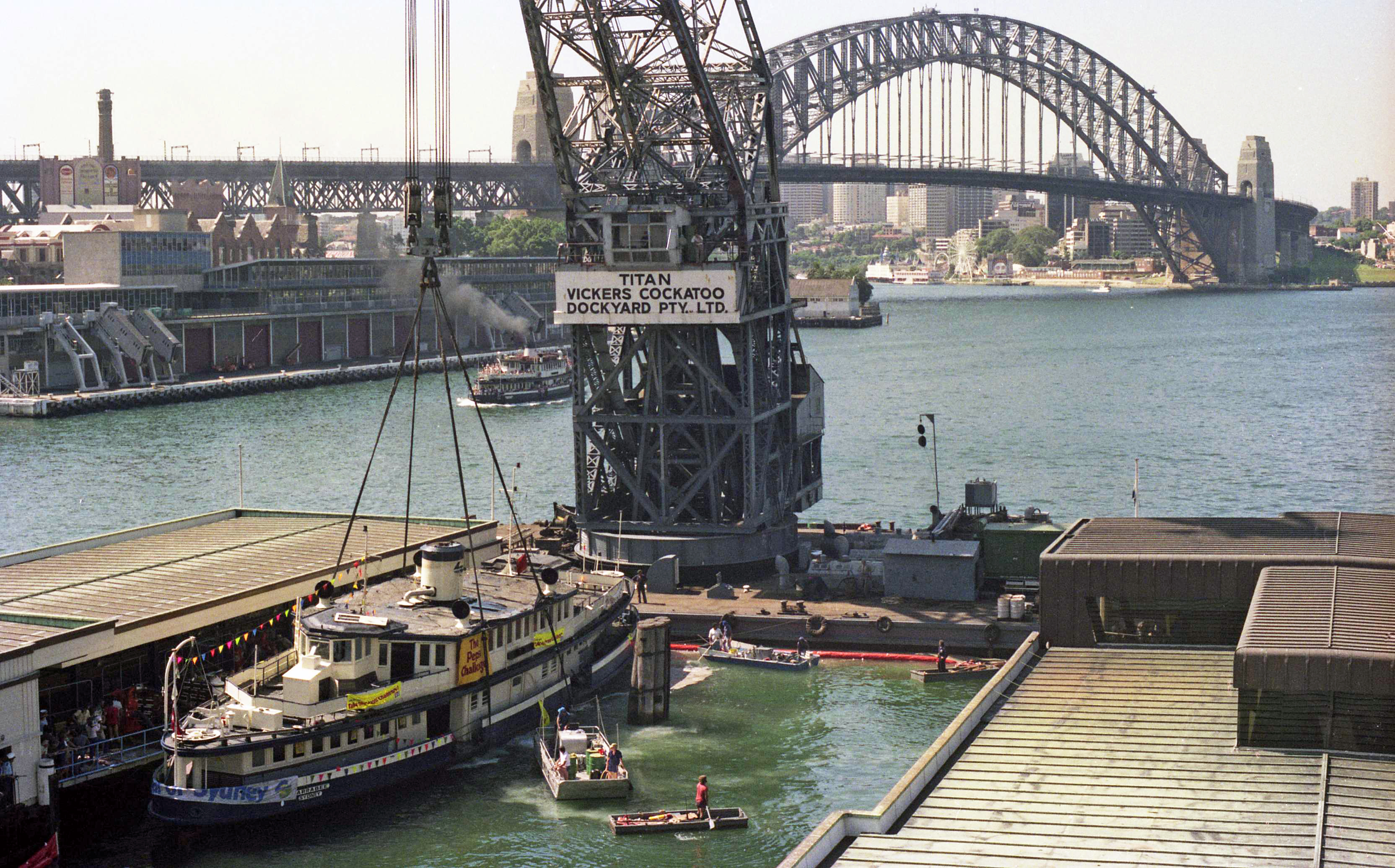
Karrabee being refloated by Titan Crane at Circular Quay, 1984

Karrabee's career as a ferry came to an end with her sinking at Circular Quay in 1984, an incident which received extensive news media coverage. Having just returned to service from an overhaul at the Urban Transit Authority's Balmain yard, on 22 January, the Karrabee took part in the annual Great Ferry Boat Race. With passengers crammed forward pushing her bow down, and the harbour chopping with the wash of pleasure craft following the race, the vessel took on water through a number of places. She finished a distant third (she came first in the inaugural event in 1980). The amount of water pouring into the vessel went unnoticed for some time, however, when Captain Archer realised what was happening, he took the ferry back early to Circular Quay.

With her nose dipping below the water, passengers were quickly disembarked at Wharf 4, and the ferry sank as the last of the passengers alighted onto the wharf. She was raised two days later by the floating crane Titan. She was towed out of Circular Quay and laid up while investigations into the sinking took place. Ultimately the cause of the sinking was found to be a buildup of rubbish around the bilge pump inlet that restricted the ability of the pumps to clear the water.

== Retirement and demise ==
Once floated, Karrabee was laid up and did not re-enter service. The remaining wooden ferries on Sydney Harbour - Lady Edeline, Kameruka, and Karingal - were taken out of service following the Karrabee’s sinking and the commissioning of the first of the First Fleet catamaran ferries in 1984.

In 1985, another old wooden ferry, Kameruka was sold for use in a proposed fun park at Lansvale and Karrabee was included in the deal free of charge. However, Kameruka sank at the mooring and was broken up by mechanical grab. In May 1986, Karrabee was sold and towed to Gosford for conversion to a floating restaurant. The business did well for a number of years, but the boat's condition deteriorated and in 2003 she settled into the mud at the wharf. In November 2005, she was broken up in place and there is some evidence that her upper structure was relocated to Kulnura. At 92 years of age, Karrabee was the oldest wooden-hulled K-class ferry (Kanangra is steel-hulled), and was among the longest-lived of all Sydney Harbour ferries.

Having been pulled out of service in 1984/85 with the other wooden-hulled ferries after Karrabee's sinking, Karingal was sold to new owners in Melbourne but sank en route in Bass Strait.

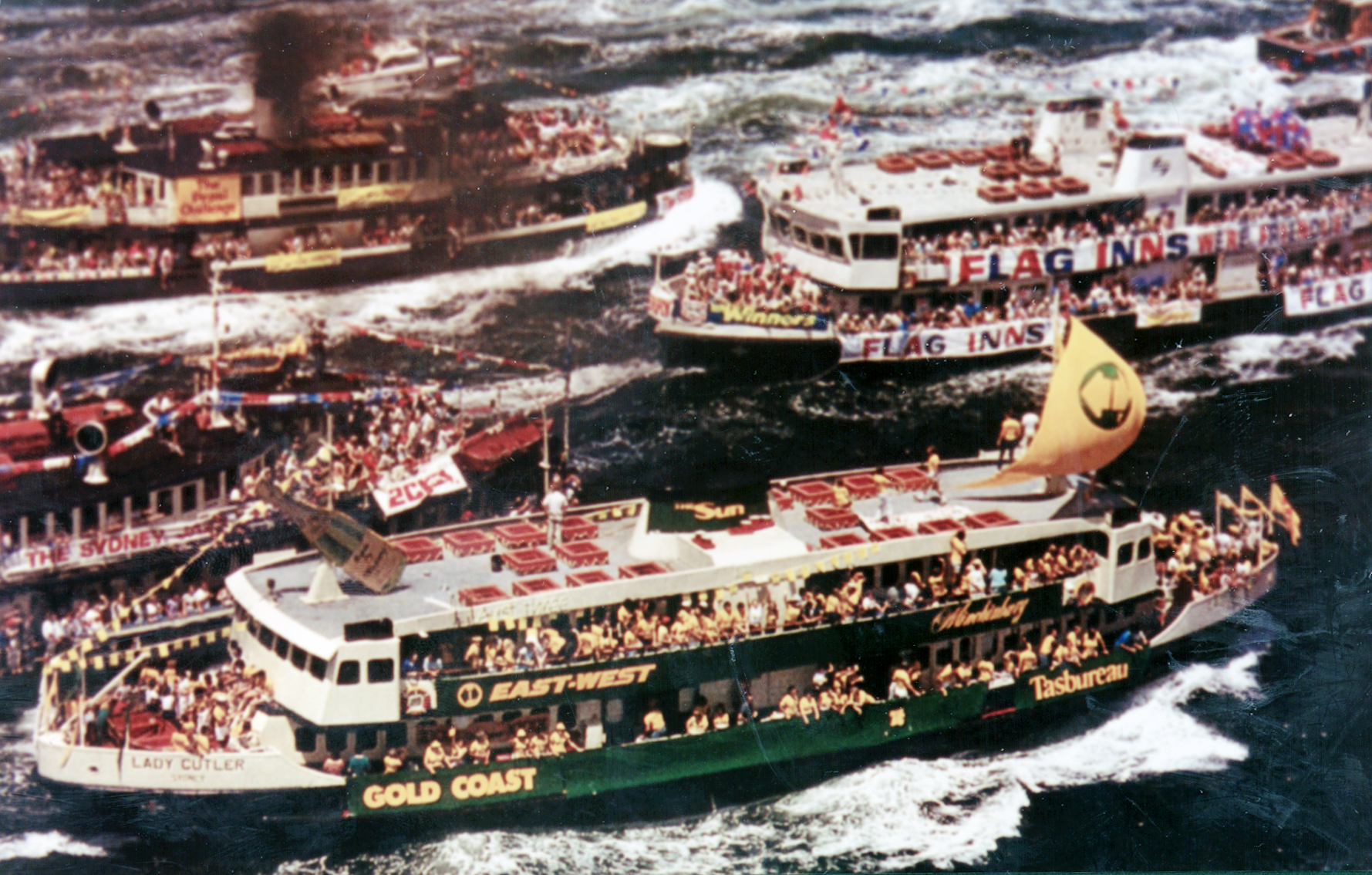
Karabee (top) in the 1980 Great Ferry Boat Race. She would sink at Circular Quay following the 1984 event.

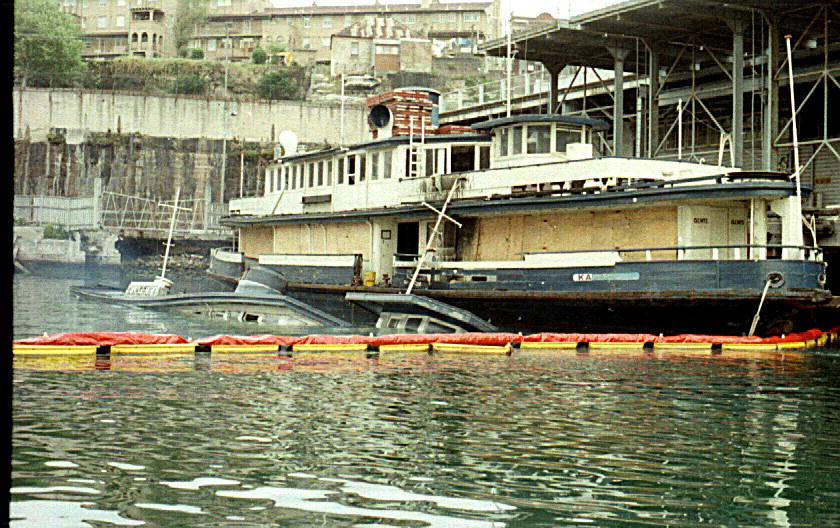
Karrabee laid up with Kameruka who has sunk at her moorings, 1986.

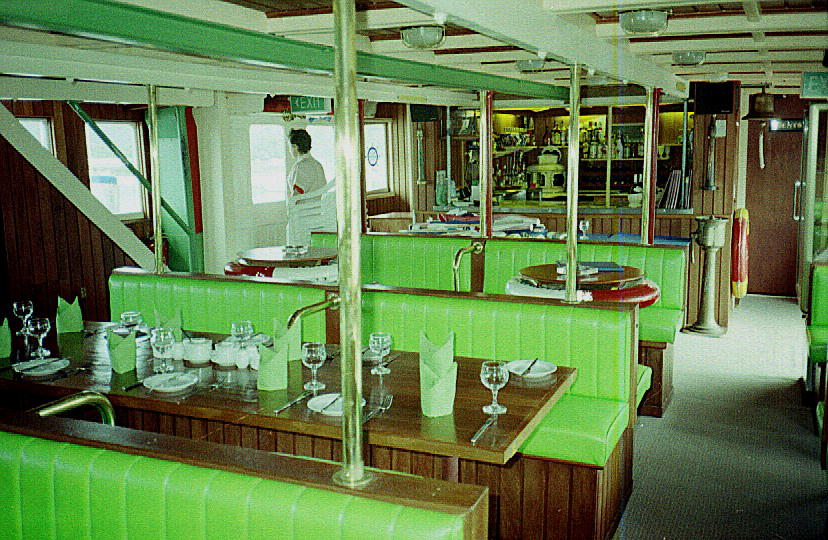
As a restaurant at Gosford, 1990s

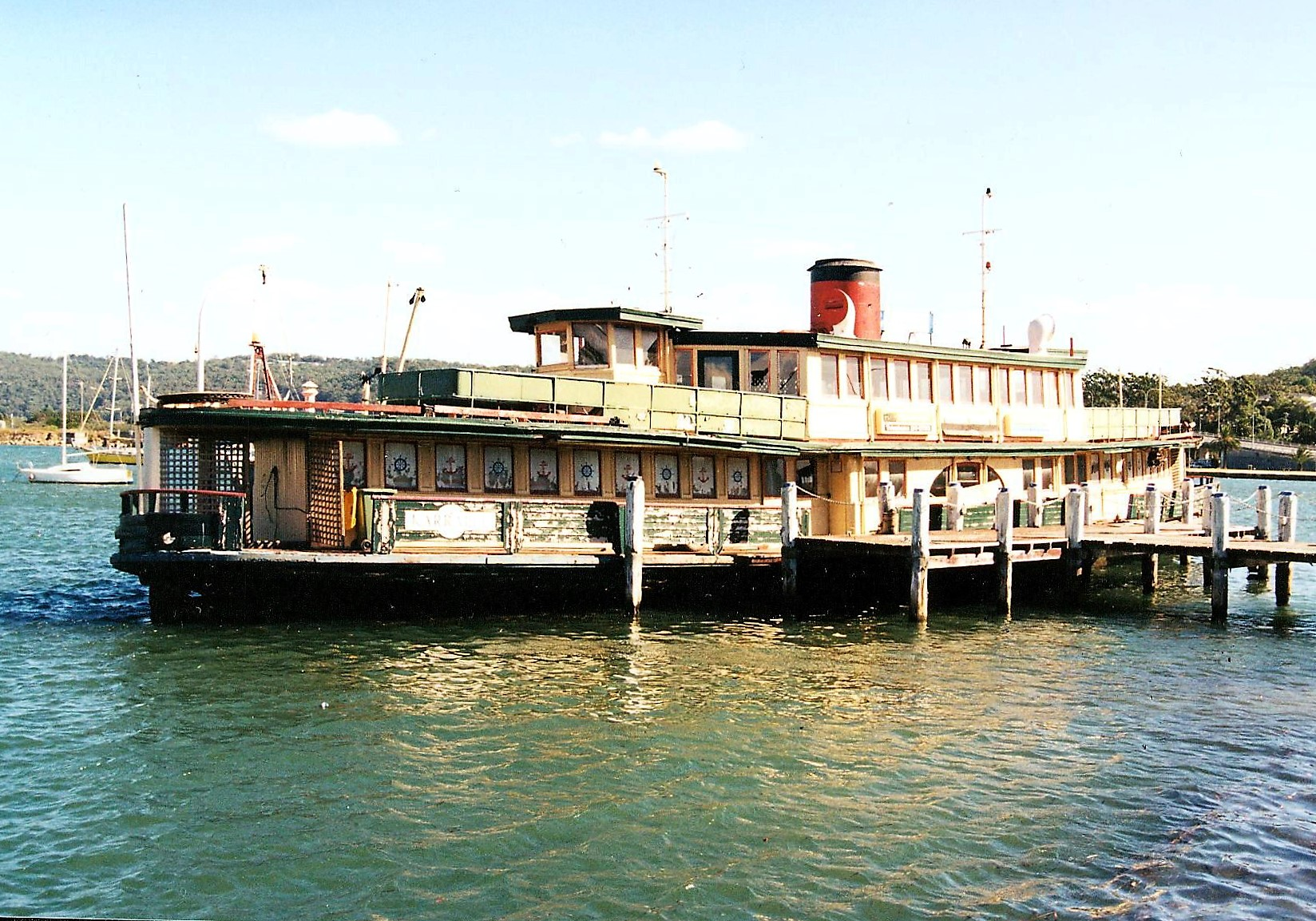
As a hulk in Gosford, 2004, a year before being broken up.

== See also ==
- List of Sydney Harbour ferries
- Timeline of Sydney Harbour ferries
