= Sydney Ferries Limited =

Company operating ferries in Sydney, New South Wales, Australia

- Founded: 1861
- Defunct: 30 June 1951
- Successor: Sydney Harbour Transport Board
- Headquarters: Sydney, Australia
- Area served: Sydney Harbour
- Key people: Colonel A Spain (Chairman)
- Services: Ferry operator

Sydney Ferries Limited operated ferry services on Sydney Harbour from 1900 until June 1951.

The company grew out of the North Shore Steam Ferry Company and took over smaller ferry operators to become the largest ferry operator in Sydney's history. Without a physical connection across the harbour, demand for ferry services to developing areas on the North Shore rose dramatically and Sydney Ferries commissioned 27 large ferries in its own right between 1900 and 1922. The company named its vessels with Australian Aboriginal words beginning with "K".

The 1932 opening of the Sydney Harbour Bridge saw the companies annual patronage drop from 40 million to 15 million.

== Nineteenth century beginnings ==
The first regular passenger ferry services across the harbour began in the 1840s and 1850s, at which time the Gerrard Brother's ran paddle steamers Ferry Queen, Brothers, and Agenoria. Herald was sent out from England for the North Shore Steam Company and later for E Evans and Partners. Demand for passengers services had developed to the point that in 1861, the forerunner to Sydney Ferries Limited, the North Shore Ferry Company, was formed as an unincorporated company. Its backers included James Milson and Francis Lord. The company's first ferries was Kirribilli (I). Nell, Galatea and Coombra followed. Land subdivision from the 1870s saw development east of Milsons Point in the Neutral Bay and Mosman areas. Mosman was first an excursion area and residential development had suffered until the regular ferry services began in the 1870s.

It became a limited liability company, the North Shore Steam Ferry Company Ltd, in 1878. On 14 December 1899, the company was incorporated as Sydney Ferries Limited. It subsequently took over the Parramatta River Steamers and Tramway Co. Ltd. (in 1901), the Balmain New Ferry Co. Ltd. in 1917 and the Watsons Bay and South Shore Steam Ferry Co. Ltd. in 1920.

Sydney Ferries acquired some innovative technology from its predecessor companies, notably the double-ended screw ferry design in which Sydney was a world leader at the time. In 1879, the North Shore Co. introduced Sydney's first, and the world's second, double-ended screw ferry, Wallaby. This remained the basic design of all Sydney double-ended screw ferries. However, the company continued to acquire paddle-steamers until 1885. They serviced the harbour's busiest route from Circular Quay to Milsons Point (50 years later the location of the Sydney Harbour Bridge) and Lavender Bay to which an all-night service was added in 1884. Milson's Point became the harbour's busiest wharf with the introduction of a connecting tram service from Ridge St North Sydney. It became busier still in 1893 with the connection of the North Shore railway line from Hornsby.

In late 1899, the North Shore Co. was reincorporated as Sydney Ferries Limited. At this stage, the fleet comprised 27 vessels including four vehicular ferries and two cargo ferries.

== Early twentieth-century expansion ==
The first 20 years of the twentieth century were a time of significant growth in demand for ferry services on the harbour, and Sydney Ferries grew rapidly.

By 1920, Sydney Ferries Limited had taken over most of its contemporaries including their vessels and services; Parramatta River services were acquired in 1901, Watsons Bay in 1920, Balmain in 1917, with Hunters Hill and Lane Cove services also acquired.

Between 1900 and 1910, the company commenced services to The Spit and Clontarf via Athol and Balmoral. It also took over and ran services to the Athol Gardens Hotel. In December 1911, a service to Robertsons (Cremorne) Point was added to meet the new tram service. The first service to Taronga Zoo commenced on 24 September 1916 with a vehicular ferry taking the elephant 'Jessi' across the harbour to her new home from the old zoo at Moore Park.

Sydney Ferries Limited also became significant harbour-side land owners buying and developing properties for the lucrative excursion trade. In 1906, the company purchased the Thompson estate at Clifton Gardens (in Mosman) including land, the three-storey hotel, wharf dancing pavilion and skating rink. The company built a large circular swimming enclosure that could hold 3,000 spectators, a boatshed and a tramway from the wharf to the hotel. Before the First World War, ferries full of picnickers came at weekends. The structure burnt down in 1956.

Sydney Ferries at this stage had a near monopoly on Sydney Harbour ferry services, except for Manly ferry services, which was run by the Port Jackson and Manly Steamship Company until the 1970s, and several small launch services. In addition to buying out most of the other ferry operators and their assets, between 1900 and 1914 the company acquired 25 large vessels – mostly of the type known as the K-class – on its own accord. Following its acquisitions of rivals, by the 1920s, the company's fleet comprised large vehicular ferries, fast single-ended steamers that ran along the Parramatta River, the "Lady-class" ferries acquired with the Balmain service, the two dozen "K-class" ferries it had built, and a number of smaller craft including lighterage tugs, water carriers and cargo ferries.

The company's largest vessels, Kuttabul and Koompartoo were delivered in 1922, each with a capacity of over 2,000 passengers for the heavy lift Circular Quay to Milson's Point run. They were the last and the largest of the "K-class" ferries and were made redundant with the opening of the Sydney Harbour Bridge in 1932.

In terms of annual passenger and vessel numbers, Sydney Ferries Limited reached its peak around 1928. While North Shore services would continue to grow until the opening of the bridge in 1932, decline in demand for other routes saw the company contract steadily from 1928. Competition from trams, buses, and railways saw the company cease Parramatta River passenger services beyond Gladesville, however, a subsidiary company ran cargo services to Parramatta until 1941. Services to Balmain were cutback in 1928 with several of the older "Lady class" ferries sold.

== Post Harbour Bridge opening ==
Prior to the opening of the Sydney Harbour Bridge, the company carried more than 40 million passengers per annum, three-quarters of which travelled on the Milsons Point-Circular Quay route. With the completion of the bridge in 1932, the company's passenger volumes dropped to 15 million. The large Milsons Point ferries, Koompartoo and Kuttabul were immediately redundant and used mainly for concert and showboat work until the outbreak of World War II. Some of their larger boats were also laid up, and a dozen smaller ferries were scrapped. Most of these were older vessels, almost 20 ferries were decommissioned.

Vehicular ferry services between Dawes Point and Blues Point, and between Bennelong Point to Milsons Point ceased less than two weeks after the bridge's opening on 19 March 1932. The 350-ton vehicular ferries, Koondooloo (1924), Kalang (1926) and Kara Kara (1926) were laid up. Other vehicular ferries were scrapped, however, Kooroongaba went to work crossing the Hunter River between Stockton and Newcastle. In the mid-1930s, demand for harbour cruises increased and the company fitted out Koondooloo as a two-deck showboat. Such was her success, that Kalang was similarly fitted out as a three-deck showboat, and a third deck was later added to Koondooloo.

The newer series of "Lady" class ferries – Ladies Chelmsford (1910), Denman (1912), Edeline (1913), Scott (1914), and Ferguson (1914) – were converted to more efficient diesel power. Sisters Karingal and Karrabee (1913), the smallest of the "K-class" ferries, were converted to diesel in the mid 1930s. As part of a refresh and change in direction following the bridge opening, the "K-class" and "Lady-class" varnished timber with white trim livery was painted over with a green on the hull and bulwarks, and yellow painted superstructure. The black funnels were repainted yellow with black tops.

The post-Bridge drop in demand for the ferry fleet was somewhat mitigated by the Great Depression of the 1930s as many could not afford their own transport. Fuel rationing during World War II made the coal required for the steam ferries relatively cheap. However, the post World War II years saw the drop in demand pick up pace. In 1951, with annual patronage down to 9 million and the business having become unprofitable, Sydney Ferries Ltd advised the Government of New South Wales of its intention to cease operating ferry services. After investigating the possibility of using statutory powers to compulsorily acquire the business without paying compensation, the government agreed to purchase of the fleet for a nominal sum, and on 1 July 1951 the 15 ferries and the workshops were sold to the government agency established for the purpose, the Sydney Harbour Transport Board. Sydney Ferries continued its business through its freight and showboat cruise company, Harbour Lighterage Pty. Ltd., which had been established as Harbor Land and Transport Co, Ltd. in 1918, retaining ownership of the showboat and former vehicular ferry Kalang.

The government contracted out operation of the fleet and Balmain workshops to the Port Jackson and Manly Steamship Company, through a subsidiary set up for the purpose, Sydney Harbour Ferries Pty. Ltd. The services and fleet were quickly rationalised with most of the larger remaining timber K-class steamers being decommissioned. Kirrule, Kiandra, Kamiri and Kirawa were all broken up at this time, and Kareela and Kubu followed in 1959. Kosciusko and Kanangra were converted to diesel and were the heavy lift vessels until 1975 and 1985 respectively.

== See also ==
- List of Sydney Harbour ferries
- Timeline of Sydney Harbour ferries
