= Kameruka and Kamiri =

20th-century ferries on Sydney Harbour

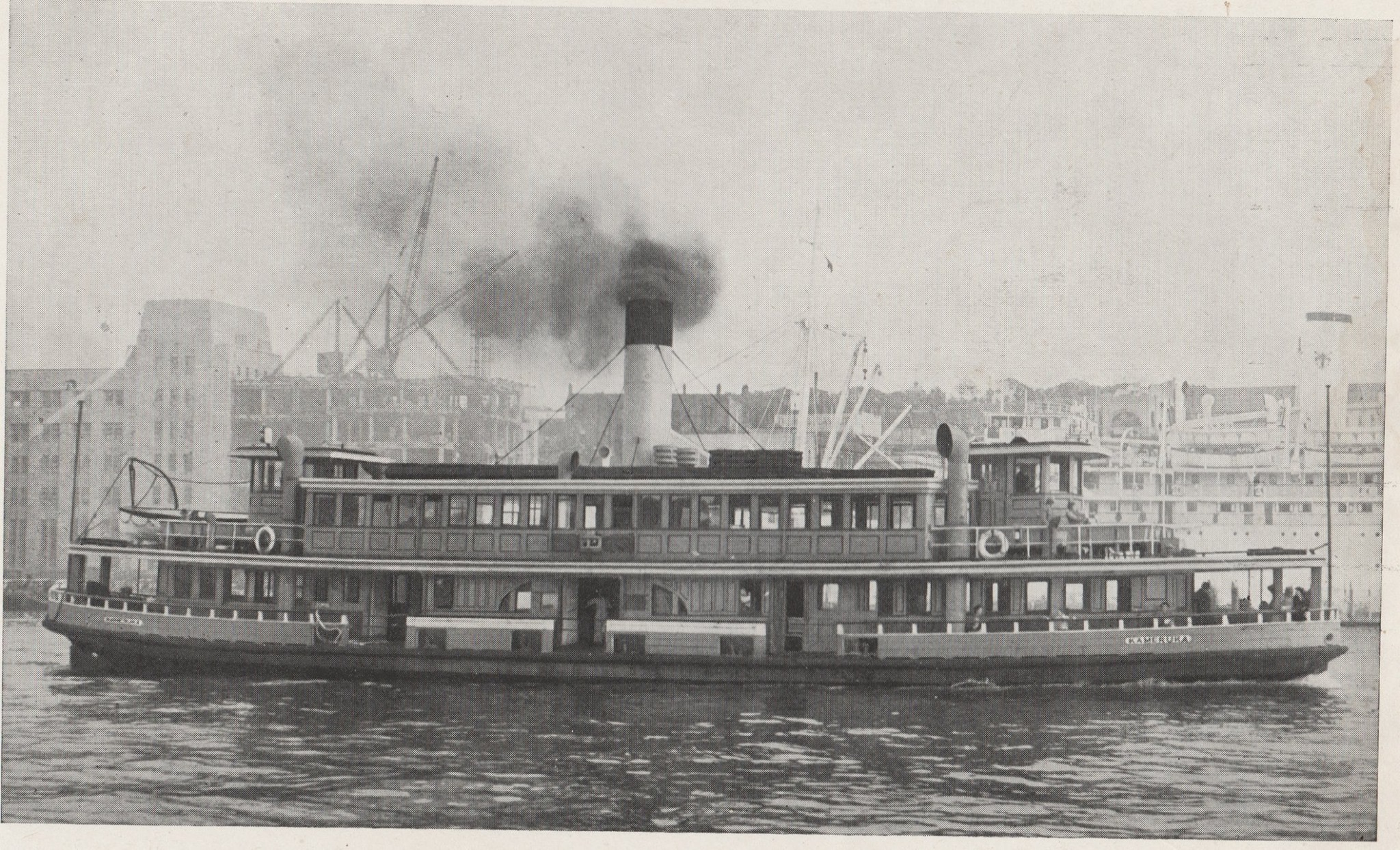
- Kameruka early 1950s(?) as a steamer

History
- Name: Kamiri, Kameruka
- Operator: Sydney Ferries Limited; Sydney Harbour Transport Board; Public Transport Commission; Urban Transit Authority
- Builder: Morrison & Sinclair
- Cost: Kameruka: £13,178
- Launched: 1912 (Kamiri) & 1913 (Kameruka)
- Out of service: 1946 (Kamiri), 1984 (Kameruka)
- Identification: Kamiri: O/N 131516
- Fate: Kamiri broken up circa 1951, Kameruka laid up 1984, sank and broken up 1986

General characteristics
- Tonnage: both 144 tons
- Length: both 34.1m
- Beam: 7.9 m
- Capacity: both 594 passengers

Kameruka and Kamiri were near identical ferries that served on Sydney Harbour. Kamiri was built in 1912 and Kameruka was launched on 8 February 1913. They were double-ended "K-class" steam ferries, a type that was prolific on Sydney Harbour in the early 20th century boom in cross-Sydney Harbour ferry transport before the 1932 opening of the Sydney Harbour Bridge. Kamiri was laid up in 1951 following the New South Wales government take-over of the Sydney Ferries Limited. Kameruka was converted to diesel in 1954 and was laid up in 1984.

Both ferries were part of a Sydney Ferries Limited tradition of naming their "K-class" ferries with Australian Aboriginal words beginning with "K". "Kamiri" is the name of an Aboriginal tribe and "Kameruka" is thought to mean 'wait til I come'.

== Design and construction ==
Both were timber vessels built by Morrison & Sinclair Ltd in Balmain. Kamiri was built in 1912 and used the engine and timbers from the ferry Kaludah which had been gutted by fire the previous year. Kameruka was built in 1913 for a cost of £13,178. The vessels were 144 tons, 34.1m long and had beams of 7.9 m. Both were provided with triple expansion steam engines by Campbell and Calderwood. Kamiri's 50 hp engine pushed her to 11 knots, and Kameruka's 53 hp engines pushed her to 12 knots. The two ferries were rated to carry 594 passengers.

== Service history ==
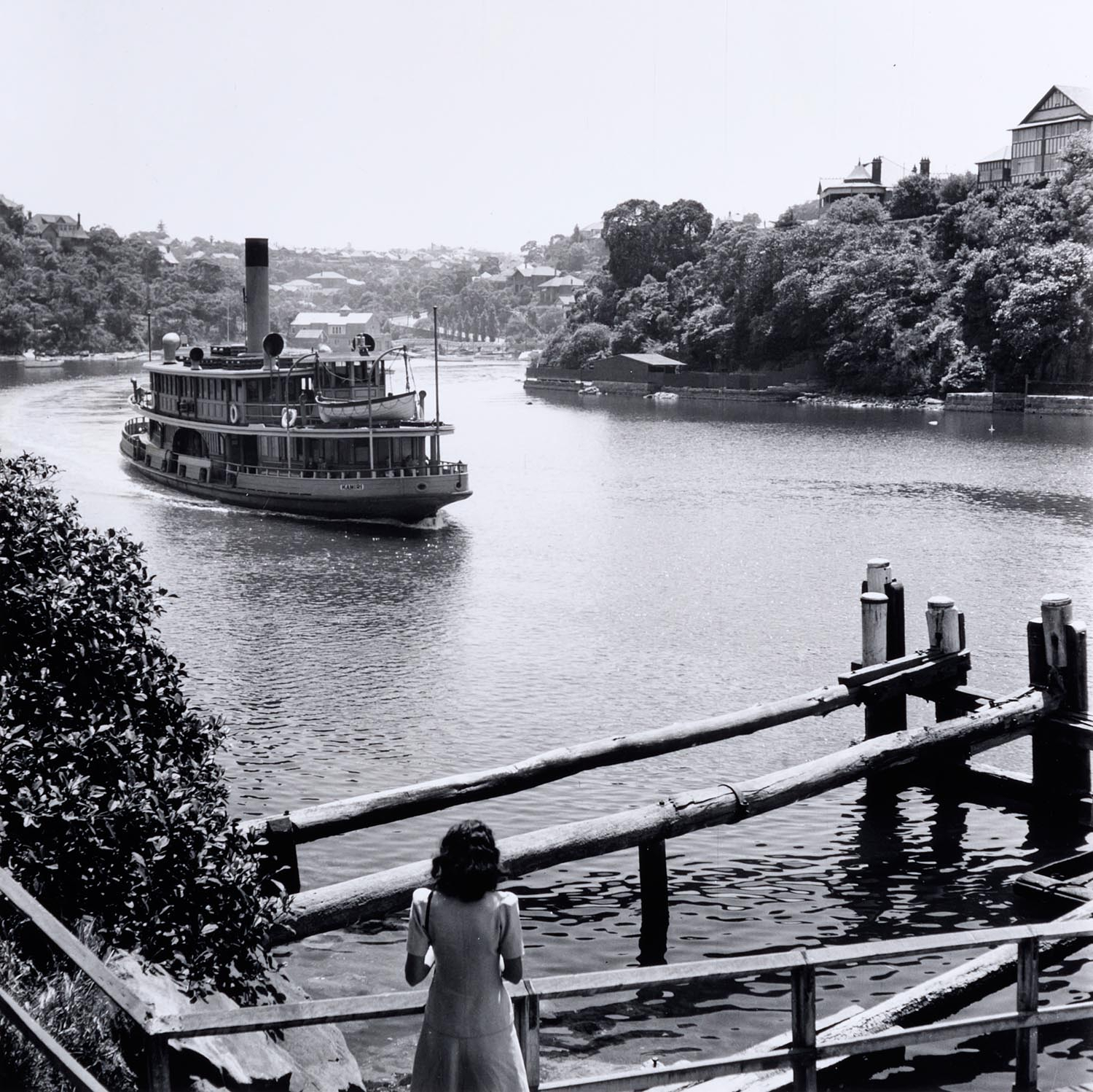
Kamiri approaching Old Cremorne Wharf, Mosman Bay, 1946. Photo by Max Dupain

Both ferries were initially used on the Parramatta River run. Little is known about Kamiri's service history. She is featured in a well-known photo of Mosman Bay by acclaimed Australian photographer, Max Dupain. She was laid up in 1946. In poor condition, she was broken up between 1951 and 1953 along with a number of other old "K-class" steamers as part of a fleet rationalisation following the NSW State Government's 1951 takeover of Sydney Ferries Limited.

Kameruka was a relatively fast ferry and thus was worked on the Taronga Zoo and Parramatta River routes. She was burnt out almost to the waterline on the night of 8 December 1918 while tied up at Gladesville Wharf. The local fire brigade and the fire float Pluvius attended. and rebuilt in 1919. In 1938, her boiler crowns collapsed and she was not returned to work until 1945. She was one of the few of the formerly large Sydney Ferries Ltd fleet to survive both the 1932 opening of the Sydney Harbour Bridge and the 1951 State Government takeover of Sydney Ferries. In 1954, she was converted to diesel (60 hp Crossley Brothers 6-cylinder, 11 knots) and given a more modern looking makeover.

Kameruka was pulled from service in October 1984 along with the other few remaining wooden-hulled ferries after fellow "k-class" wooden ferry, Karrabee sank at Circular Quay in January of that year. Karrabee was refloated and sold, and Kameruka given free to the buyer as part of the deal. She sank in 1986 while laid up alongside Karrabee at Pyrmont. She was broken up and pulled from the bottom of the harbour by grab dredge. Her 71 years of ferry service was one of the longest for any ferry on Sydney Harbour.

== Timeline ==
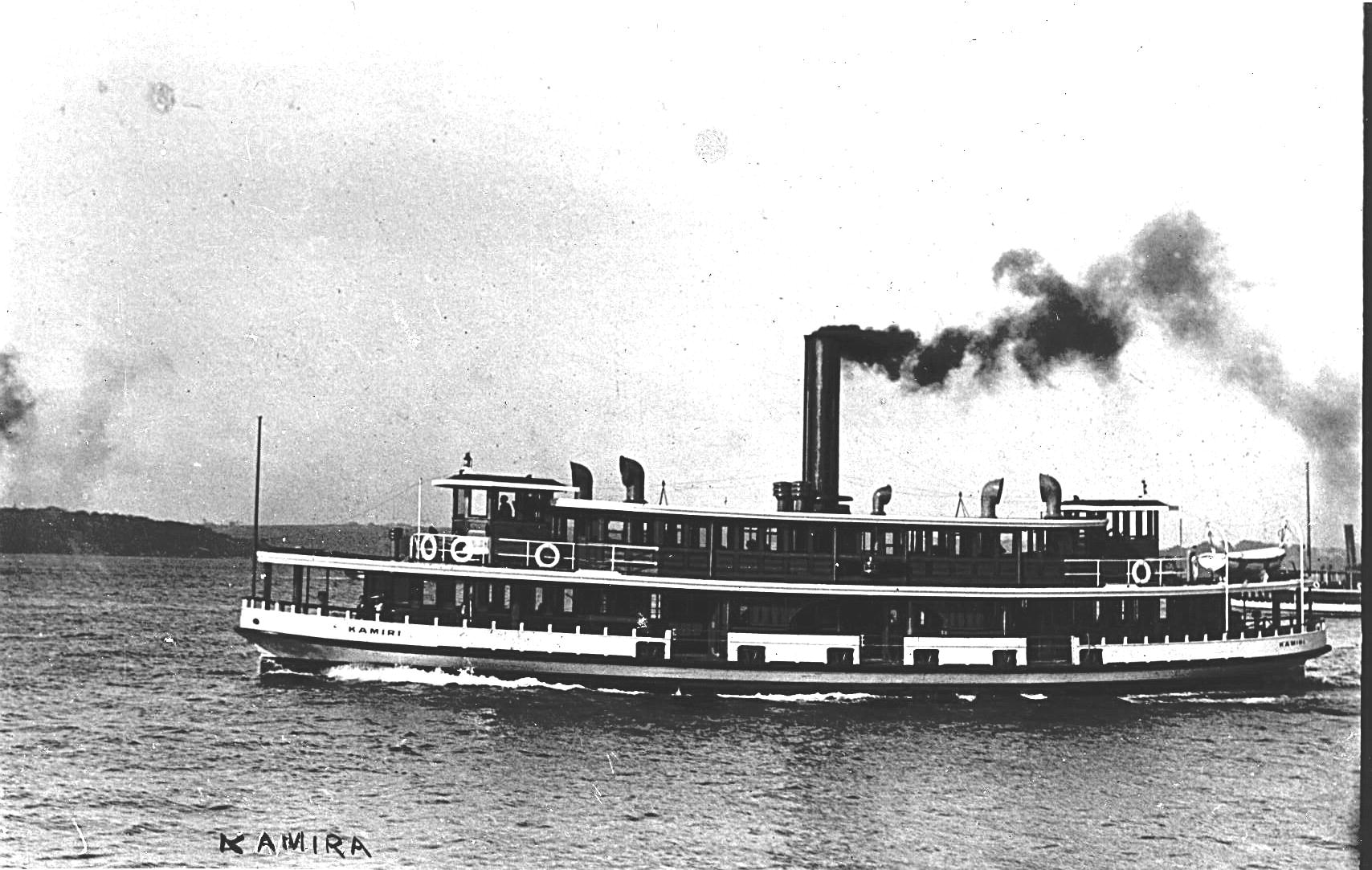
A new Kamiri in her original varnished timber with white trim livery, likely 1912 her launch year.

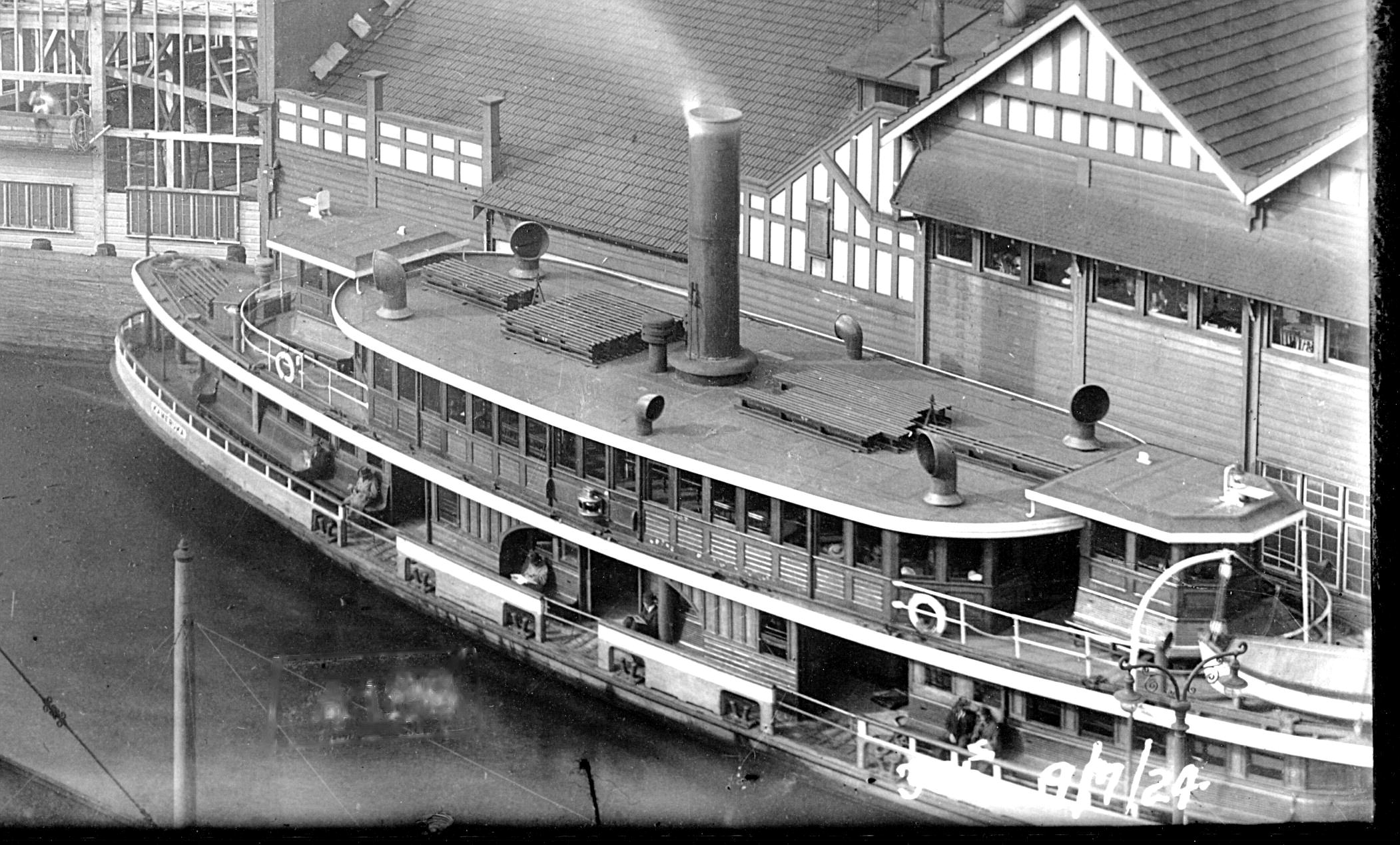
Kameruka in her original varnished timber and white trim livery, Circular Quay pre early 1930s. Prior to her first re-built with her original rounded (not squared) roof life returns to wheelhouse

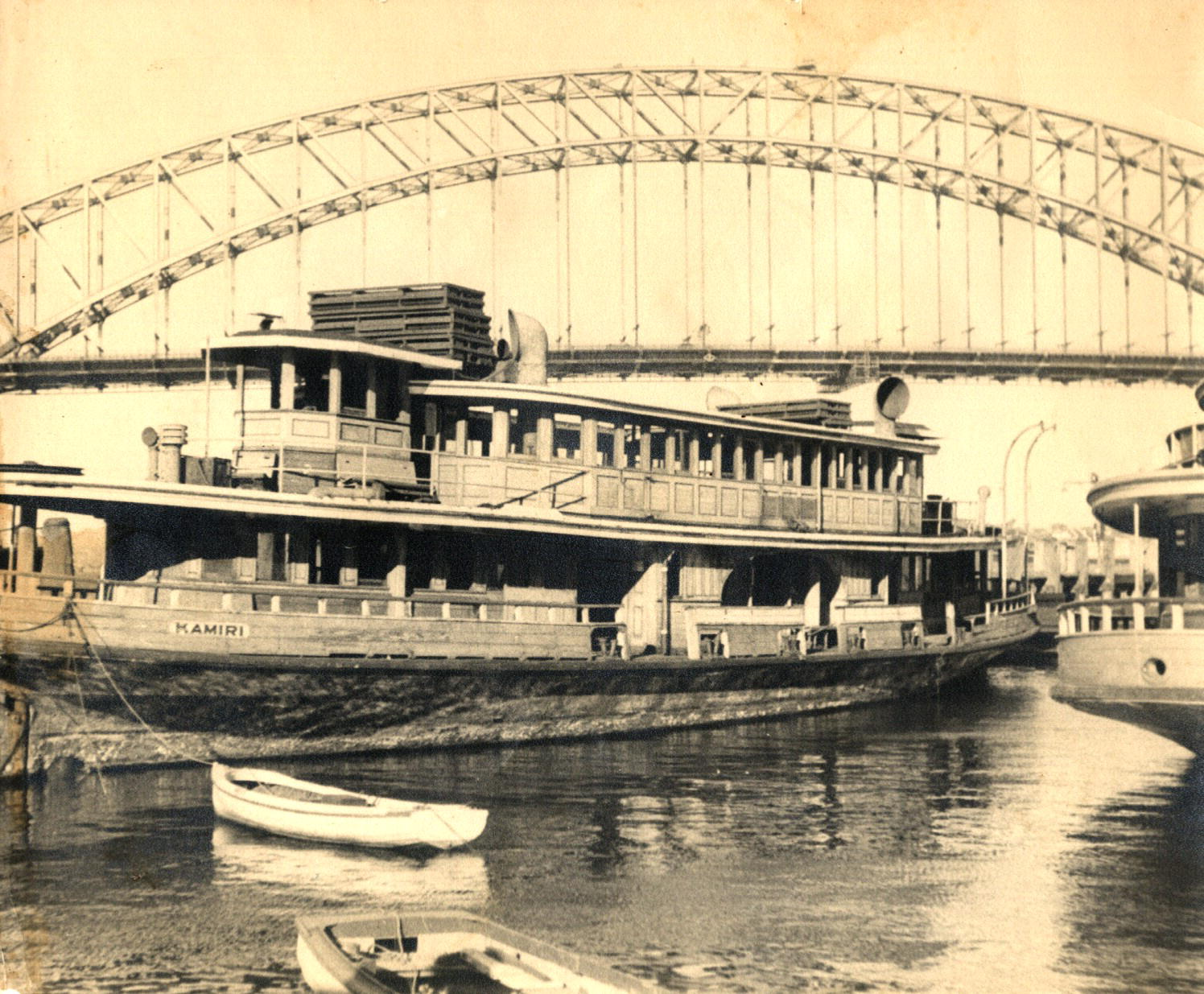
Kamiri laid up at McMahons Point following the State Government takeover of Sydney Ferries Ltd

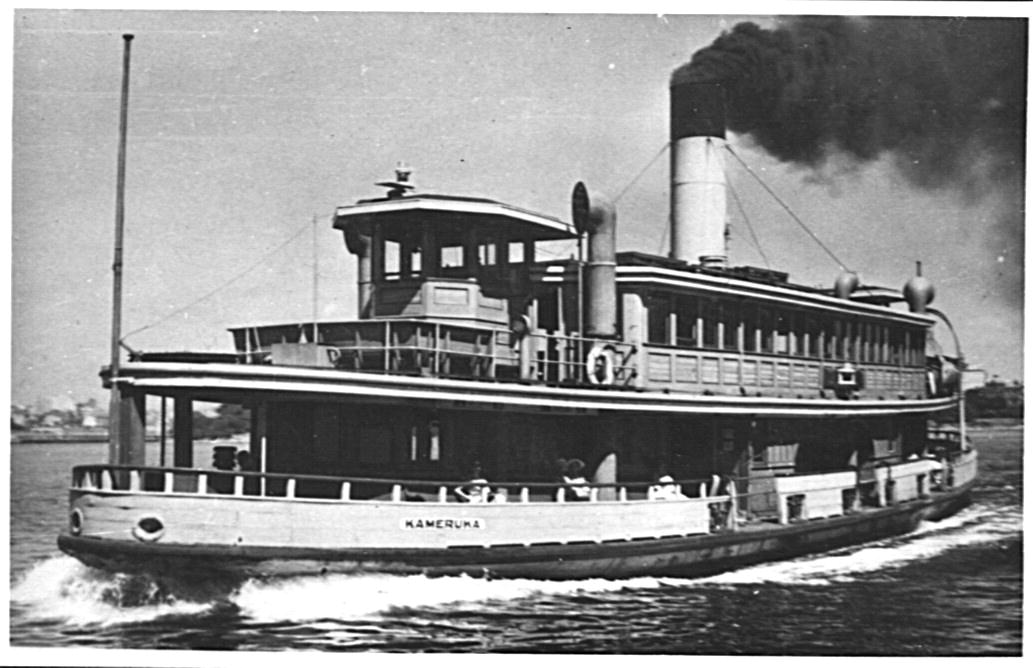
Kameruka steaming to Cremorne Point, 1950s

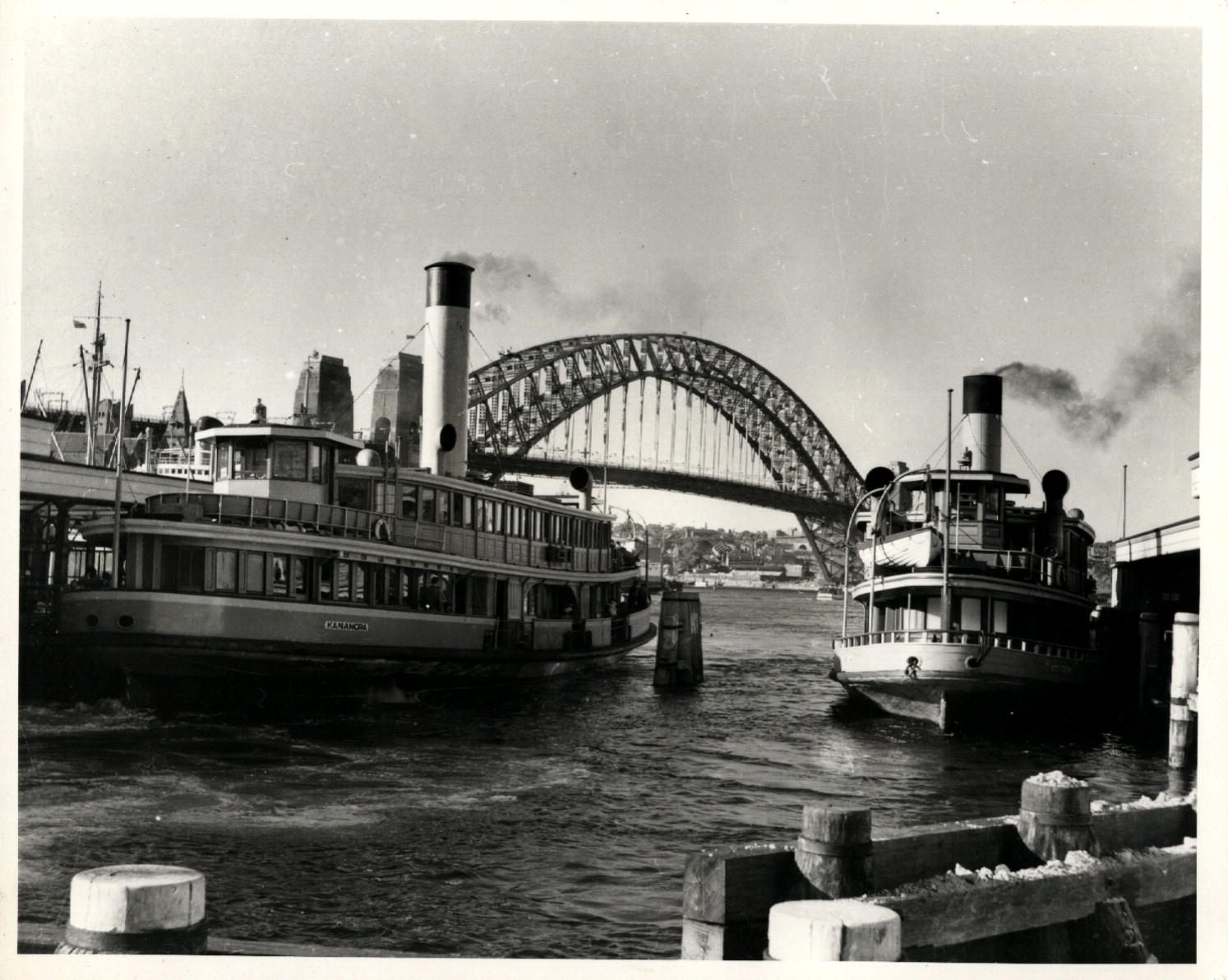
Kameruka (right) alongside the larger steel-hulled Kanangra in 1954 her last year as a steamer.

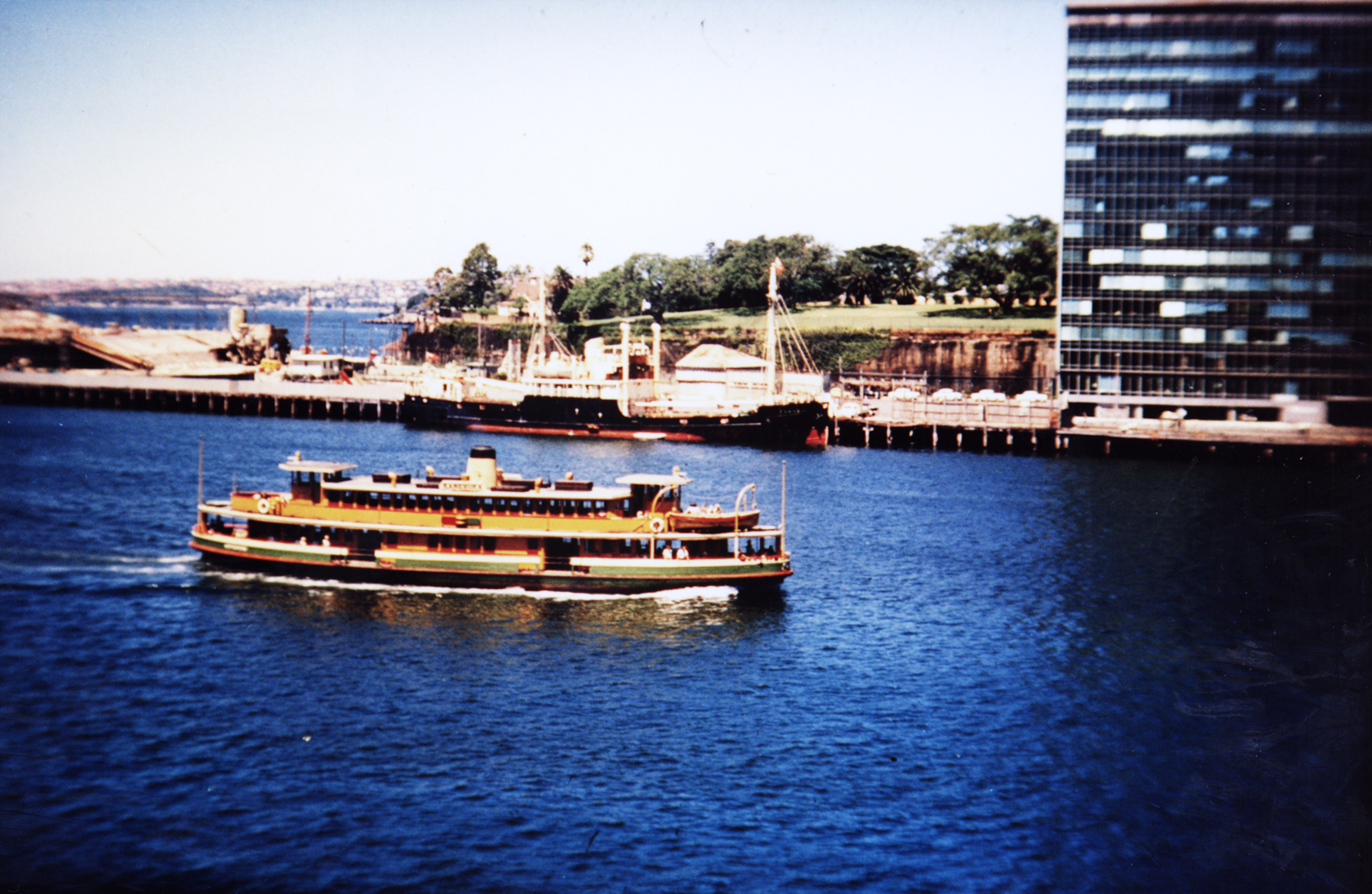
Kameruka in 1964 after her 1954 rebuild and conversion to diesel.

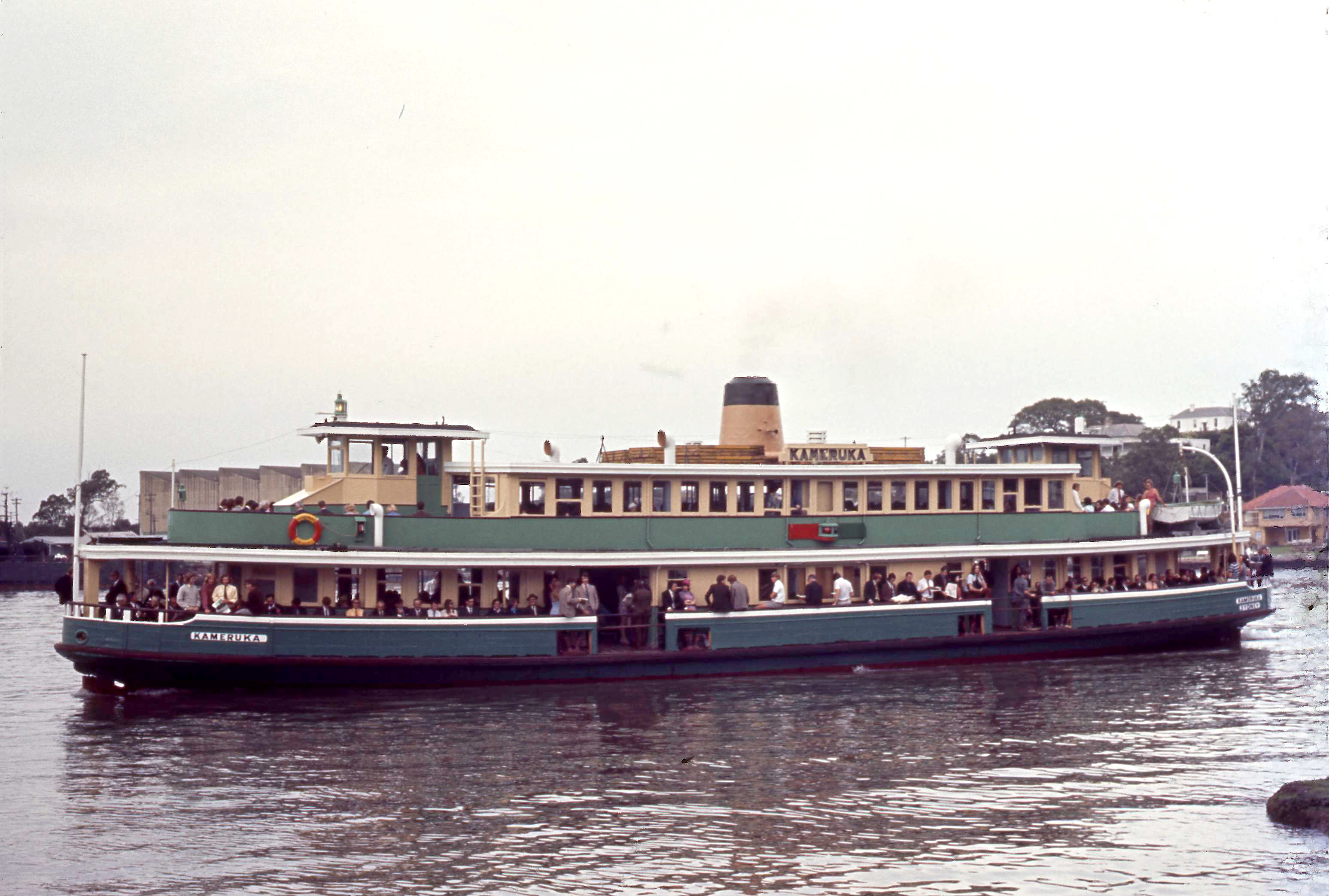
Kameruka in her Sydney Harbour Transport Board livery leaving Valentia Street wharf. 1971

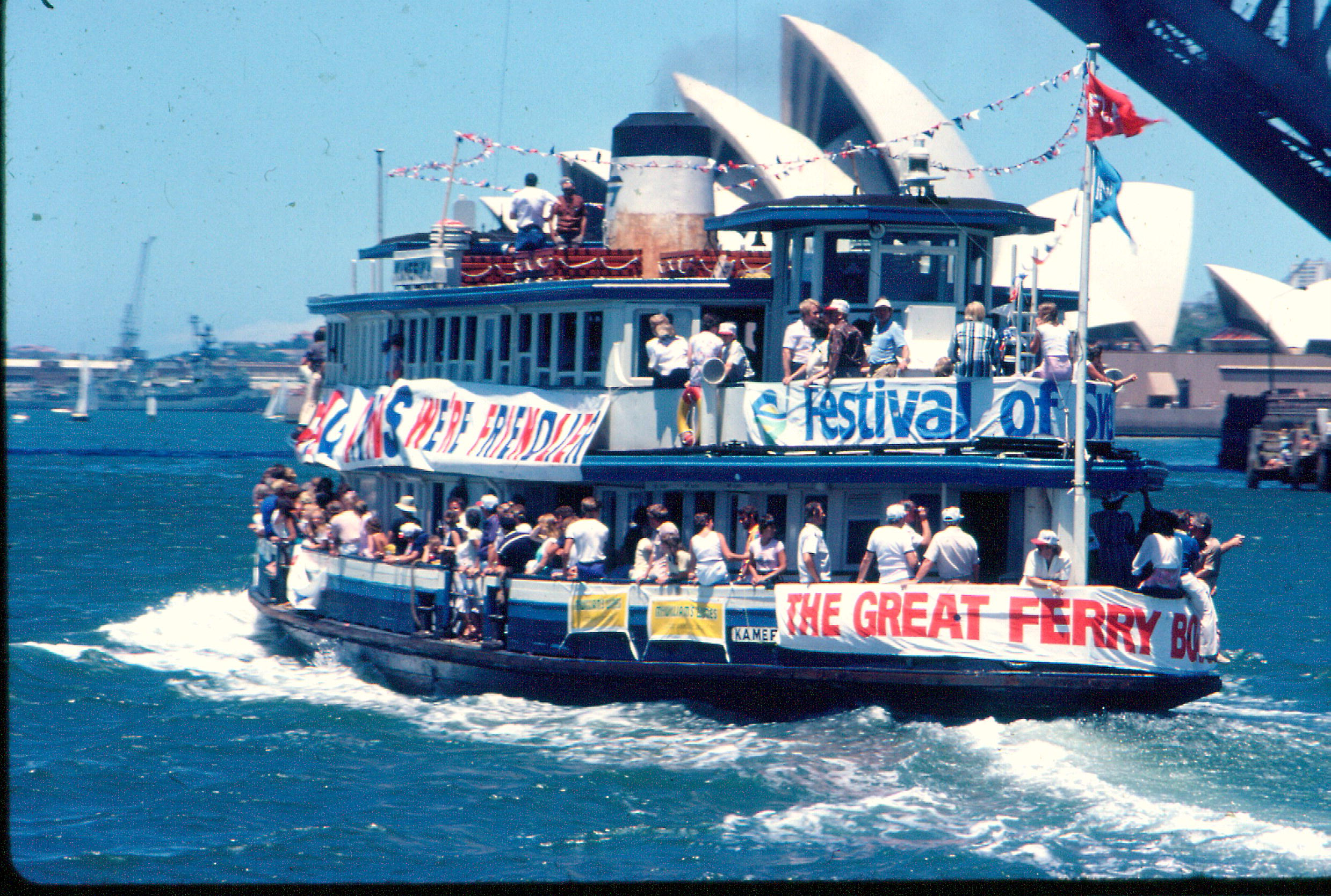
Kameruka in her Urban Transit Authority livery competing in the 1981 Great Ferry Boat Race

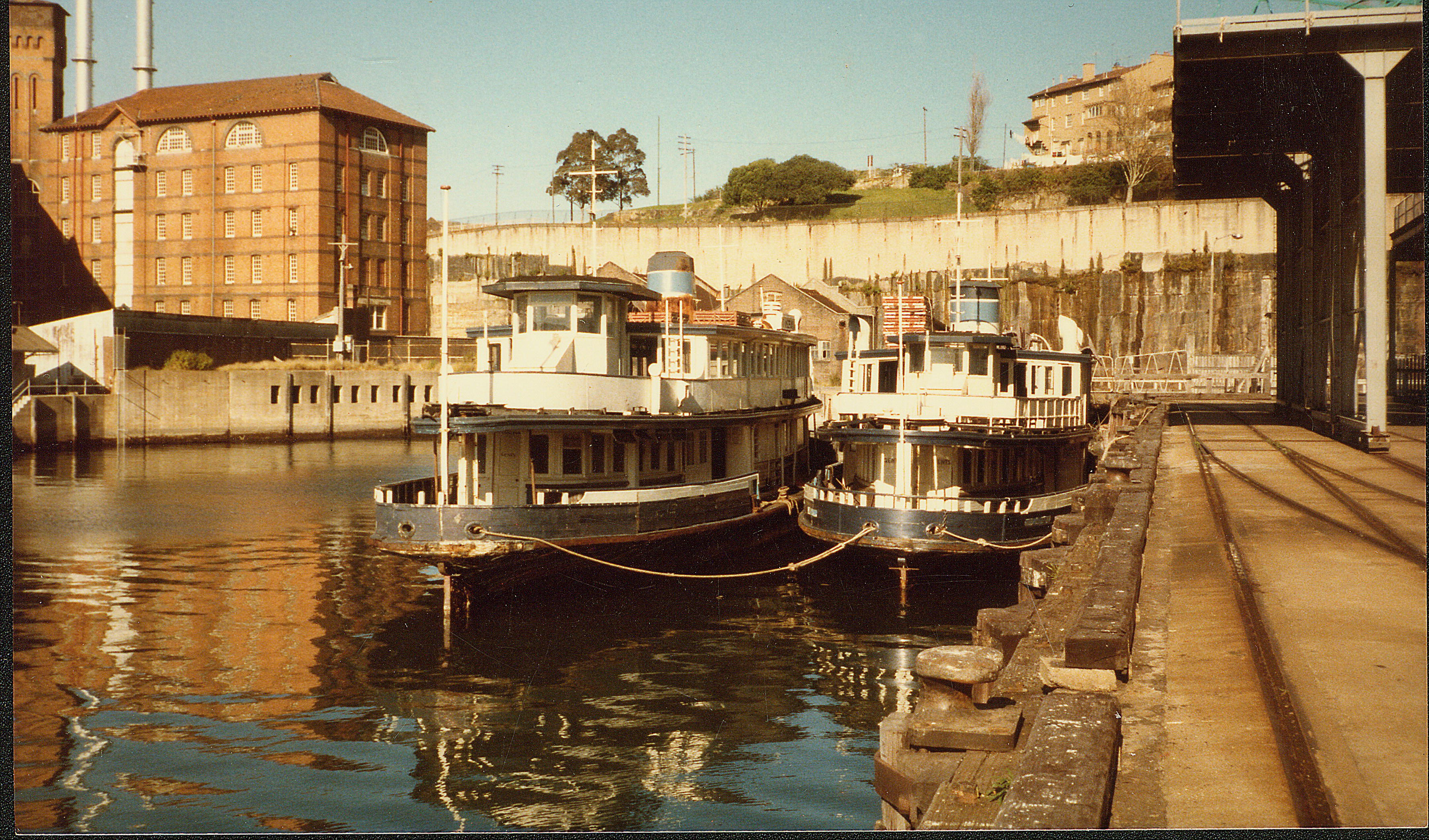
Kameruka (left) laid up alongside Karrabee at Pyrmont, 1984

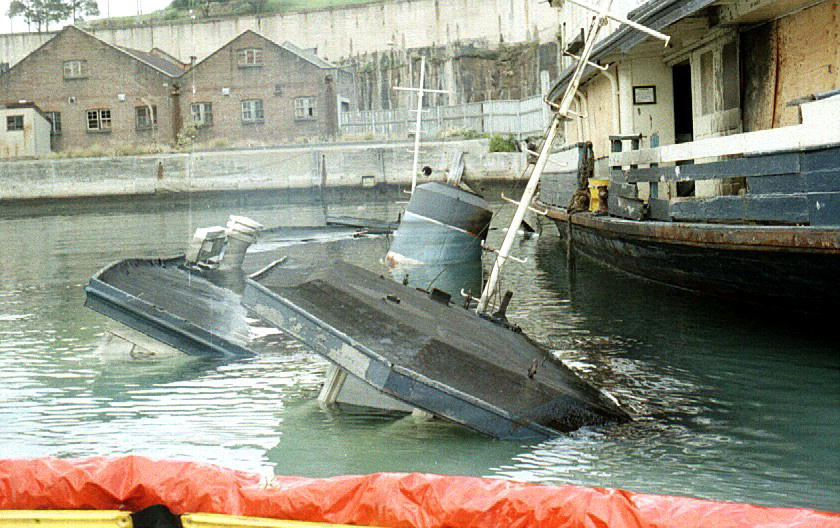
Sunken at her mooring alongside Karrabee, Pyrmont circa 1985 or 86

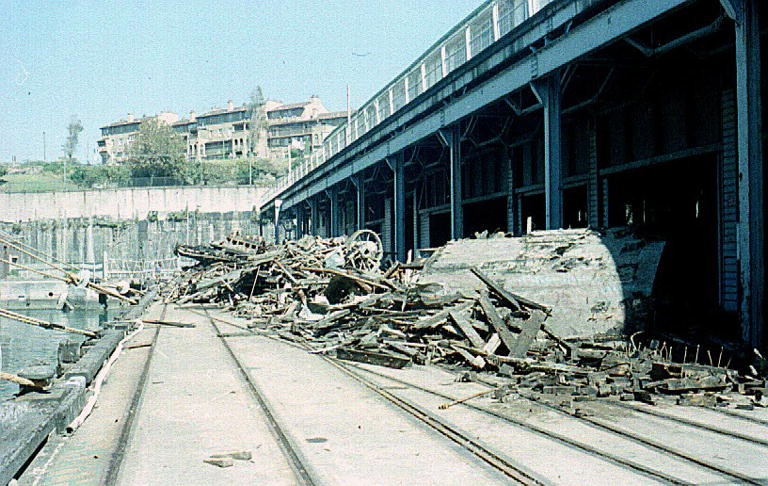
Kameruka's remains after being pulled from the harbour by grab dredge.

== See also ==
- List of Sydney Harbour ferries
- Timeline of Sydney Harbour ferries
