= Urban Transit Authority =

Transport authority in New South Wales, Australia

Statutory Authority overview
- Formed: 1 July 1980; 46 years ago
- Preceding Statutory Authority: Public Transport Commission
- Dissolved: 15 January 1989; 37 years ago
- Superseding Statutory Authority: State Transit Authority
- Jurisdiction: Sydney; Newcastle
- Headquarters: Sydney
- Key document: Transport Authorities Act 1980 (NSW)

The Urban Transit Authority, a former statutory authority of the Government of New South Wales, was responsible for the operation and maintenance of buses and ferries in Sydney and Newcastle from July 1980 until January 1989.

== History ==
The Urban Transit Authority was established pursuant to the Transport Authorities Act 1980 (NSW) that separated the functions of the Public Transport Commission with the State Rail Authority taking responsibility for trains, and the Urban Transit Authority responsibility for buses and ferries.

It was replaced in January 1989 by the State Transit Authority.

== Fleet ==
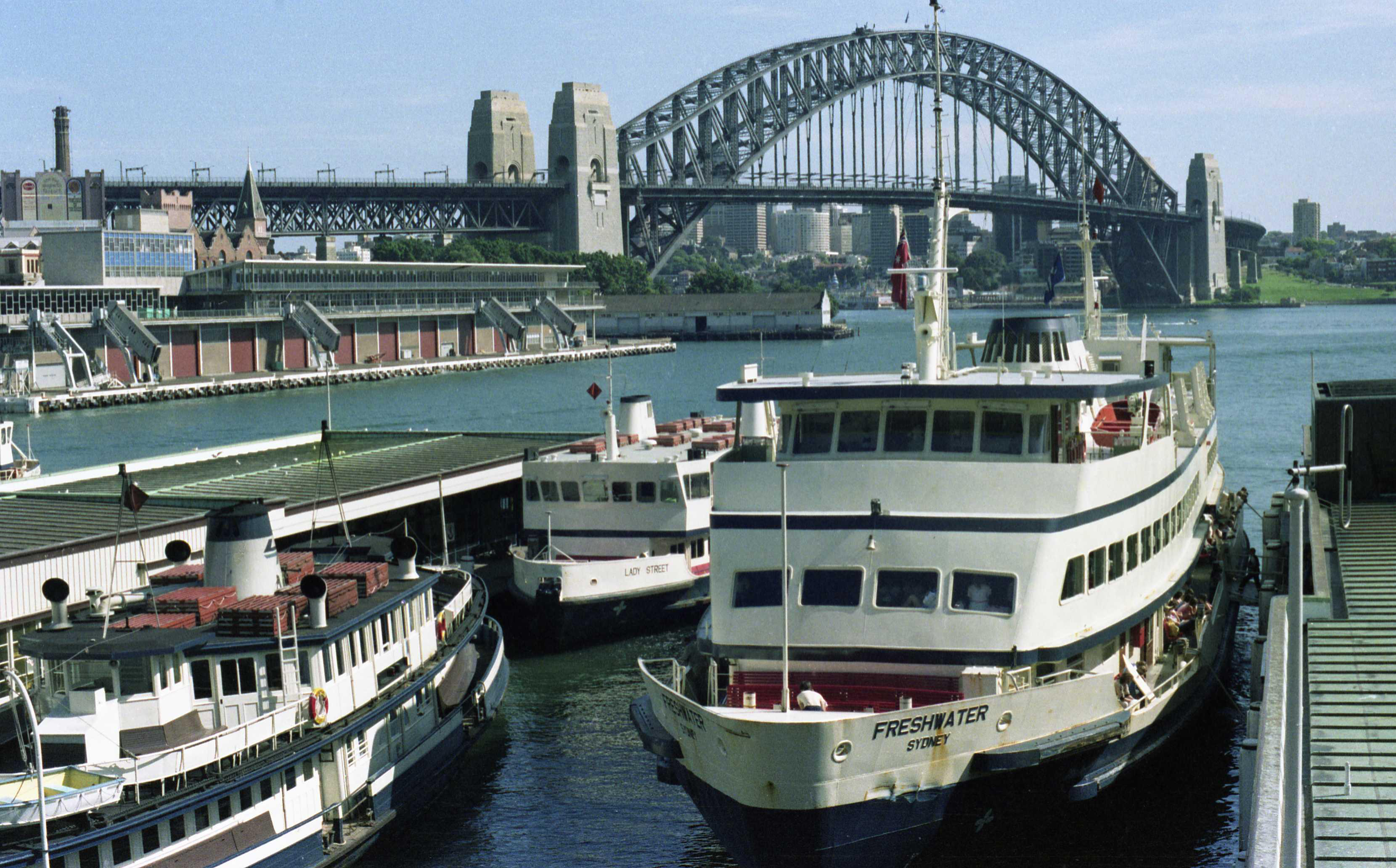
Ferries Karingal, Lady Street and Freshwater in Urban Transit Authority colours, Circular Quay, 1983

Urban Transit inherited a fleet 1,680 buses comprising Leyland Worldmasters, circa 740 Leopards, Atlanteans and 657 Mercedes-Benz O305s. By 1987 the O305 fleet would total 1,287, the world's largest. These along with Mercedes-Benz O405s had replaced most of the Leylands when Urban Transit ceased.

The inherited ferry fleet consisted of five ferries dating from the 1910s (Kameruka, Kanangra, Karingal, Karrabee and Lady Edeline), seven Lady class ferries (Cutler, McKell, Woodward, Wakehurst, Northcott, Herron and Street), two Manly ferries (Baragoola and North Head) and five hydrofoils (Fairlight, Dee Why, Curl Curl, Long Reef and Palm Beach).

Urban Transit introduced four Freshwater class ferries for the Manly service (Freshwater, Queenscliff, Collaroy and Narrabeen), two hydrofoils (Manly and Sydney) and nine First Fleet catamarans (Sirius, Supply, Alexander, Borrowdale, Charlotte, Fishburn, Friendship, Golden Grove and Scarborough).

== Services ==
Among the new services introduced by Urban Transit were route 111 Sydney Explorer in November 1980 and route 300 Circular Quay - Sydney Airport in 1982. Both were operated by Mercedes-Benz O305 buses in dedicated liveries.

== See also ==
- Timeline of Sydney Harbour ferries
