= Morrison & Sinclair =

Australian ship-building company

Coordinates: 33°50′49″S 151°11′11″E

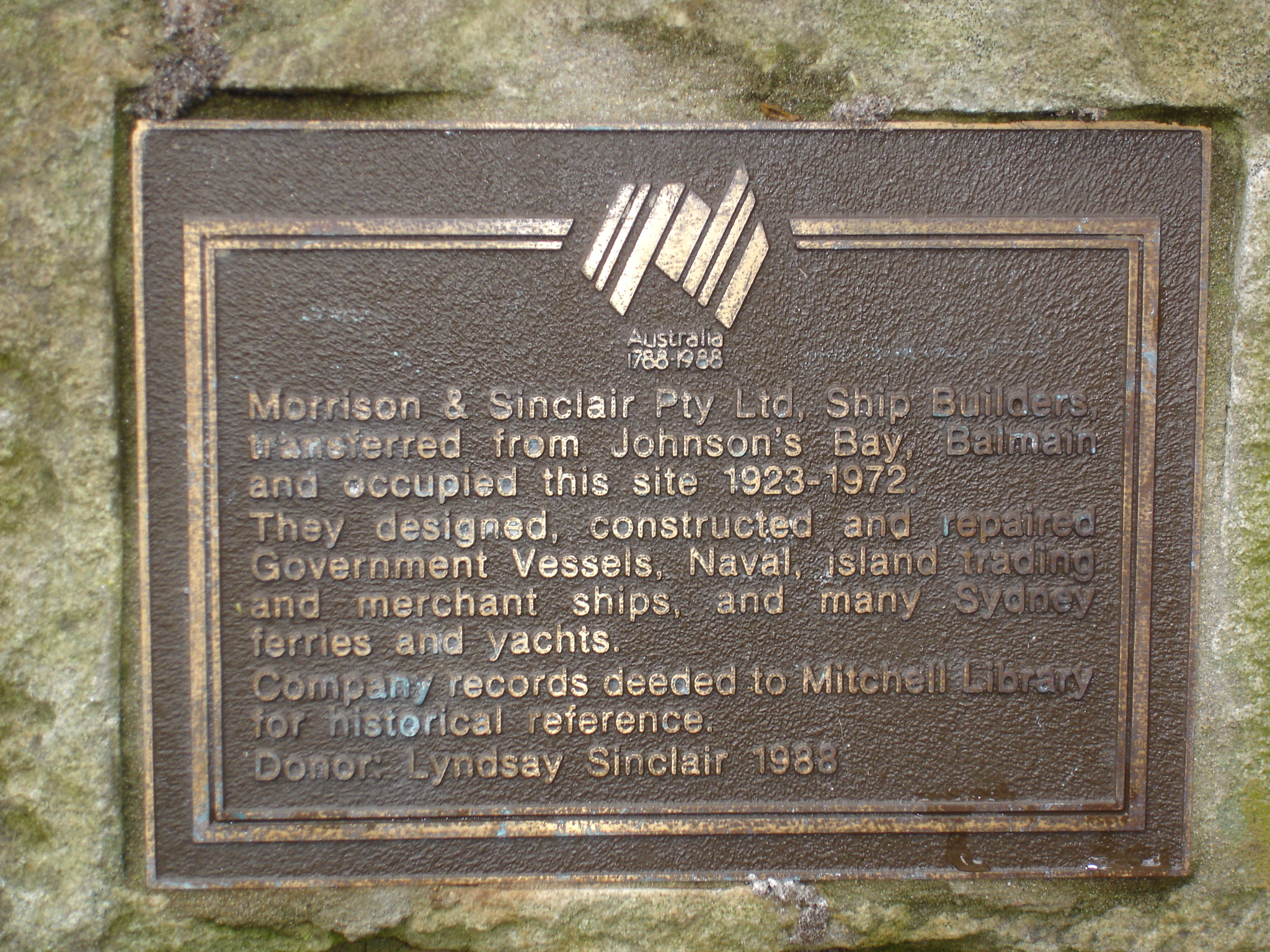
- Information plaque located at former site
- Type: Private
- Industry: Shipbuilding
- Founded: c. 1890s
- Defunct: 1970
- Headquarters: Sydney, New South Wales, Australia
- Products: Ships, boats, ferries, yachts

Morrison & Sinclair was a Sydney, New South Wales based company and one of the great ship and boatbuilding names of Port Jackson. The company was founded in the early 1890s and ceased trading in 1970.

== History ==
In 1923, Morrison & Sinclair Ltd transferred from Johnstons Bay in Balmain to a site at the end of Long Nose Point on the Balmain Peninsula and carried out a shipbuilding operations there until the company ceased trading in 1970.

The company designed, constructed and repaired Government vessels, naval, island trading and merchant ships and many Sydney Ferries and yachts. The yacht Morna (later Kurrewa IV), which won line honours 7 times from 10 starts in the Sydney to Hobart Yacht Race, was built here. (But, MORNA was built in 1913 - obviously at the Johnstons Bay site). Morrison & Sinclair Ltd no longer exists but the records of the company are held by the State Library of New South Wales.

On 17 June 1971, the shipbuilding land was acquired by the State Planning Authority of New South Wales for A$185,000. Landscaping was carried out by Bruce Mackenzie & Associates and the site, then known as Long Nose Park, placed under Leichhardt Council control in 1981. The park won the 1986 Australian Institute of Landscape Architects Award of Merit. The park has since been renamed Yurulbin Park.

== See also ==
- The nearby suburbs Balmain and Rozelle both located on the Balmain Peninsula.
- Thomas Sutcliffe Mort, co-founder of the Dry Dock and Engineering Works at nearby Mort Bay.
