= Lady Scott =

Sydney Harbour ferry built in 1914

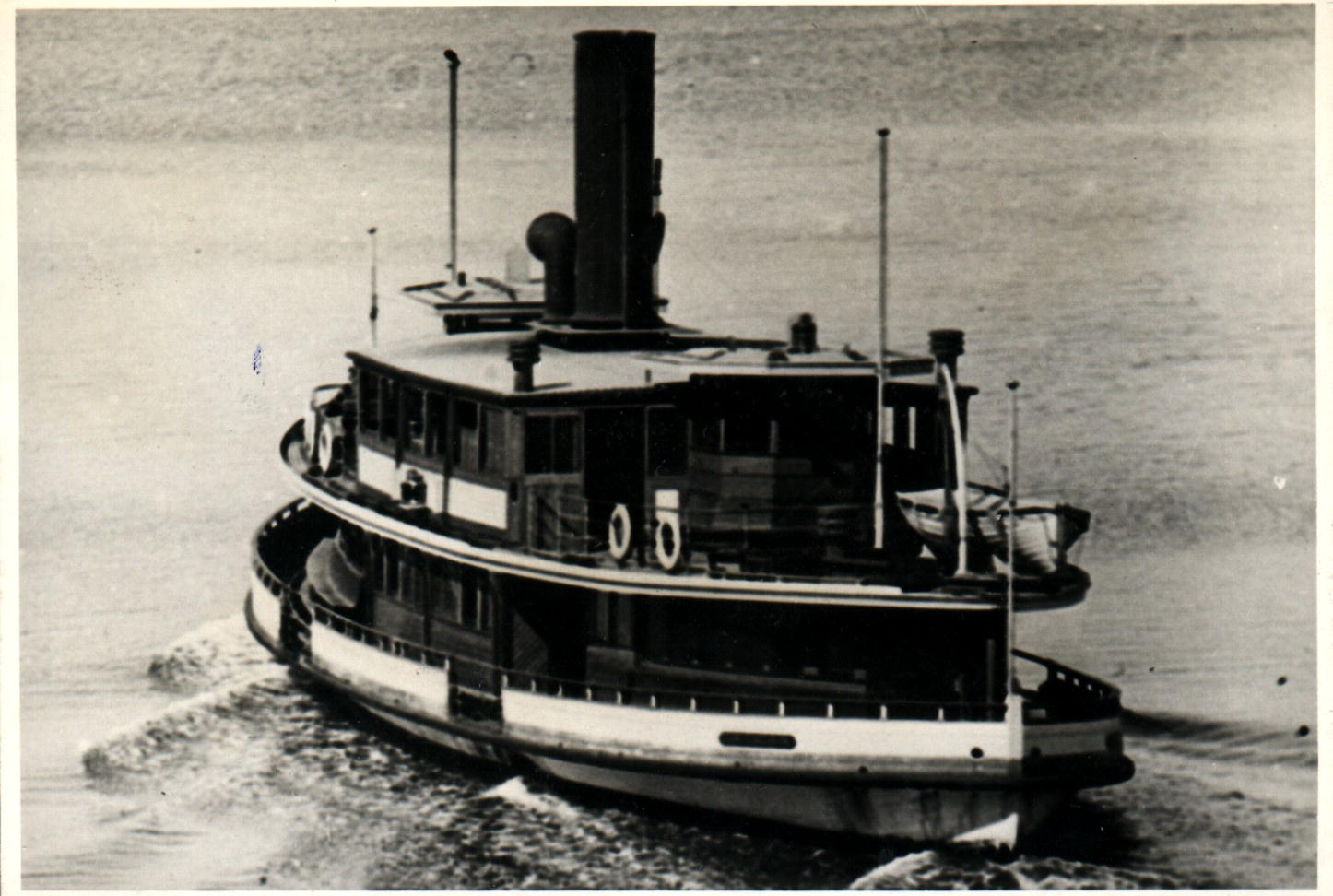
- As a steamer on the Lane Cove River, 1920s

History
- Name: Lady Scott (later John Cadman and Aqua Queen)
- Namesake: Kathleen Scott
- Operator: Balmain New Ferry Company, Sydney Ferries Limited, Sydney Harbour Transport Board, Public Transport Commission
- Builder: J Dent of Jervis Bay
- Launched: 1914
- Out of service: end ferry service 1969, cruise boat until 2014
- Fate: Sank and broken up 2014

General characteristics
- Tonnage: 95 tons
- Length: 33.5 m
- Propulsion: Steam (1914-1937), Diesel (from 1937)
- Speed: 11 knots as built, 9 knots as diesel
- Capacity: 486 as built, 572 (1937-1969)

Lady Scott, later John Cadman and Harbour Queen, was a Sydney Harbour ferry built in 1914 for the Balmain New Ferry Company, and named in honour of Kathleen Scott. She and four similar ferries, Lady Chelmsford (1910), Lady Denman (1912), Lady Edeline (1913), and Lady Ferguson (1914), were a new series of "Lady-class", designed by naval architect, Walter Reeks.

Lady Scott and her four sisters survived the 1932 opening of the Sydney Harbour Bridge and were converted to diesel power that decade. They also survived the 1951 NSW State Government takeover of the ailing ferry fleet. Lady Scott was sold out of ferry service in 1969 for use as a cruise boat. A 1972 fire destroyed her superstructure and she was re-built and successfully run as the John Cadman cruising restaurant. She was sold to new owners, renamed Harbour Queen and enjoyed limited subsequent success. She sank in 2014 in Blackwattle Bay where she was broken up.

== Design and construction ==
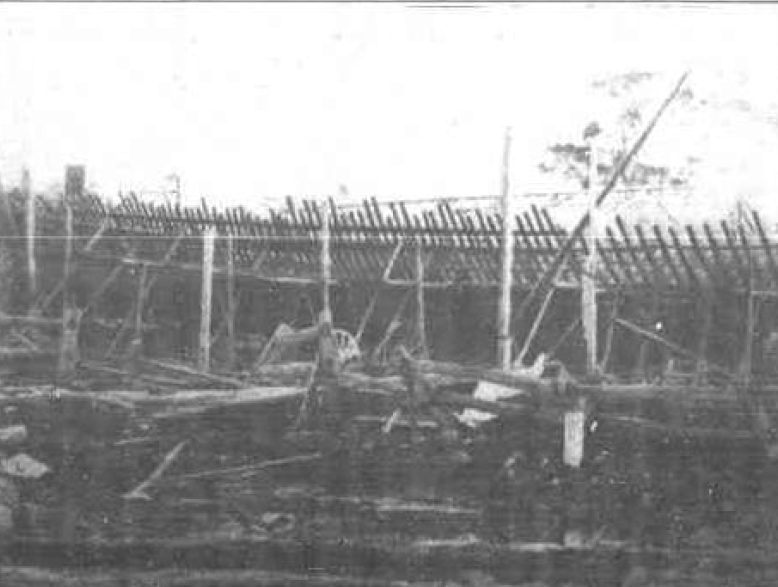
Under construction on the slips at Currambene Creek Jervis Bay

In common with most Sydney Harbour ferries at the time, Lady Scott and her four sisters were wooden double-ended screw steamers. The five ferries had only a single propeller at one end that pushed the vessels in one direction and pulled them in the other. This feature was introduced by the ferry's designer, Walter Reeks, on a previous Balmain company ferry, Lady Rawson of 1906. The configuration contrasted with the double-ended vessels of Sydney Ferries Limited (the K-class ferries) which had a continuous propeller shaft and a screw at each end. A single propeller and one shaft simplified the internal arrangements and put less stress on the timber hulls compared to shafts running a propeller at either end. Apart from some unusual handling characteristics, the single-propeller configuration was a success and Reeks unsuccessfully tried to patent it.

Along with Lady Denman (1912), Lady Scott hull was built by J Dent of Jervis Bay from local timbers. Lady Scott was launched on 4 November at Huskisson and christened by Miss Roderick, daughter of one of the Directors of the Balmain New Ferry Co, and named in honour of Kathleen Scott. The vessel was towed to Sydney to receive her machinery supplied by McKie & Baxter of Glasgow. The engines were compound 2-cylinder (12" and 24" x 18"), 24 hp (nominal), 160 hp (indicated). She had one boiler of 12 lb pressure and a 7-ton bunker capacity. Her maximum speed was 11.5 knots. Other finishing works was also carried out in Sydney. Lady Chelmsford was built by Brisbane Water shipbuilder Rock Davis, Lady Edeline by G A Washington of Annandale, and Lady Ferguson by David Drake of Balmain

With construction of a Sydney Harbour Bridge seeming likely, she and her four sisters were designed for a maximum of fifteen years of life. Instead, the five would serve on the harbour for at least 60 years, with Lady Scott operating as a ferry until 1969 then as a cruise boat being broken up in 2014. Because they were intended to have a limited life-span, they were lightly built and almost austere in their fittings, such as roofs of galvanised iron. The five were relatively small and had a veed shape and shallow draft to navigate the muddy and silted upper reaches of their upstream runs.

== Service history ==
From 1900, the Balmain New Ferry Company began a period of expansion to keep up and compete with the tram network expanding into what is now referred to as Sydney's Inner West. Older ferries were sold off including several series of "Lady-class" ferries were introduced.

Lady Scott was the fourth of five in the Balmain company's final series of "Lady-class" ferries, the others being Ladies Chelmsford (1910), Denman (1912), Edeline (1913), and Ferguson (1914). This series was introduced to replace the single-ended ferries on the Lane Cove River service. They also worked on the run from Balmain to Erskine Street wharf (at site of current Barangaroo).

Lady Scott, and the rest of the Balmain fleet, were bought by Sydney Ferries Limited as part of its take over of the Balmain company on 1 March 1918. The five operated the Lane Cove River services to Fig Tree until 12 November 1931 when weekday services were suspended. They ran weekend services to Fig Tree on weekends until 2 September 1945. Lane Cove River services were discontinued altogether on 10 November 1950, after which the five saw them work the Parramatta River and across other routes. Sydney Ferries ran a service to Balmain until it was taken over in 1939 by Nicholson Brothers Harbour Transport Company with their own ferries. The five "Lady class" ferries were run on other routes across the harbour.

In 1932, the Sydney Harbour Bridge was opened, and Sydney Ferries Limited's annual patronage dropped from 40 million to about 15 million. As part of economy measures, almost older and/or larger steamers were put up for sale, and the five "Lady-class" ferries were converted to diesel power in the 1930s with Lady Chelmsford first. Their tall black smoke stacks were replaced with short funnels. Facing uncertain post-Bridge times, Sydney Ferries Limited sought a refreshed look for their ferries, covering the original livery of varnished timber and white trim with yellow and green paint and red trim. On 17 December 1937, Lady Scott re-entered service with a six-cylinder 190 hp Gardner diesel that pushed her to 9 knots. The five "Lady" ferries continued to run the Hunters Hill and Balmain services.

The post-Bridge drop in demand for the ferry fleet was somewhat mitigated as many could not afford their own transport in the Great Depression of the 1930s and rationing of fuel during World War 2 made the coal required for the steam ferries relatively cheap.

However, the post World War II years saw the drop in demand pick up pace. In 1951, with annual patronage down to 9 million, the NSW State Government took over Sydney Ferries Limited and its remaining fleet and assets. The Port Jackson & Manly Steamship Company, which ran the Manly service, was paid to run the services. The services and fleet were quickly rationalised with most of the larger remaining timber K-class steamers being decommissioned, however, the five relatively small and economical "Lady-class" ferries were retained. Throughout the remainder of the 1950s and into the 1960s, they became the back-bone of Sydney Harbour's non-Manly ferry fleet, along with Karginal and Karrabee the smallest of the K-class ferries. Their routes were expanded to all inner-harbour (ie, non-Manly) services including Taronga Park Zoo, Milsons Point, Cremorne and Hunters Hill.

The five sister ferries (except Lady Scott) were re-engined again in the late 1950s and early 1960s. In the 1960s the Board updated all their ferries' 1930s green and gold livery to a more muted cream and khaki scheme.

Lady Scott, like most ferries on Sydney Harbour, had her share of incidents:

- In 1925, her propeller shaft broke disabling the ferry off Balls Head. She drifted for half an hour before assistance.
- In 1931, she crashed into Longnose Point wharf developing a leak.
- In 1943, she collided with Lady Ferguson at Circular Quay with considerable damage done to the Lady Ferguson.
- In 1952, she overshot Cremorne wharf and ran aground with about 40 people on board, mostly children. Although no-one was injured, the ferry broke a propeller shaft when she hit the rocks.
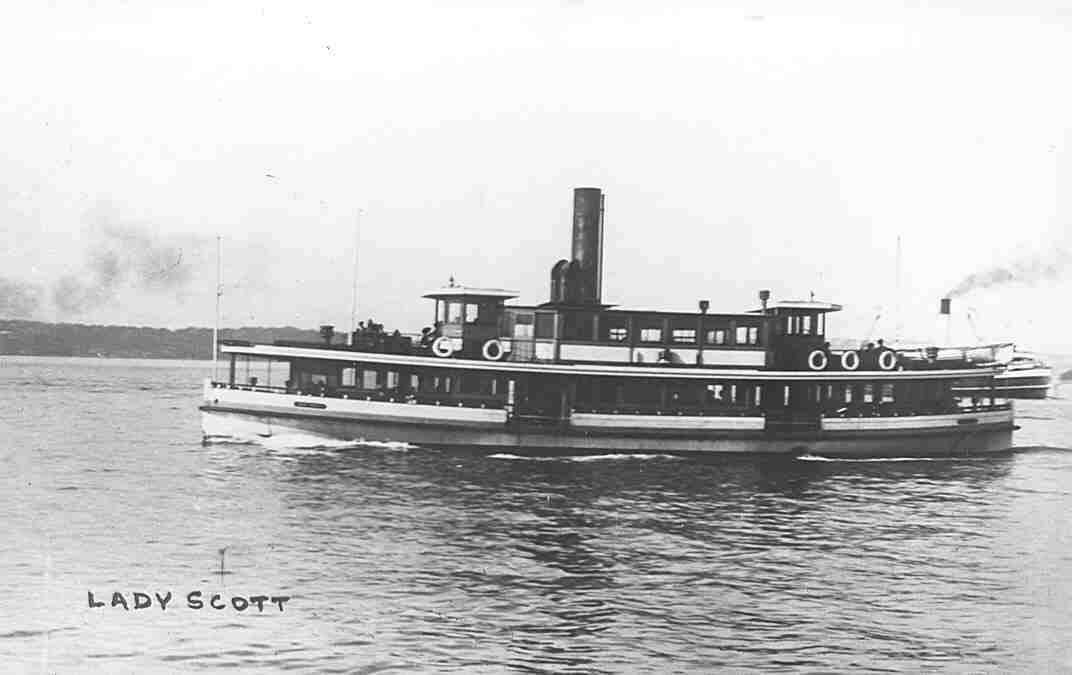
As built, with tall offset smoke stack

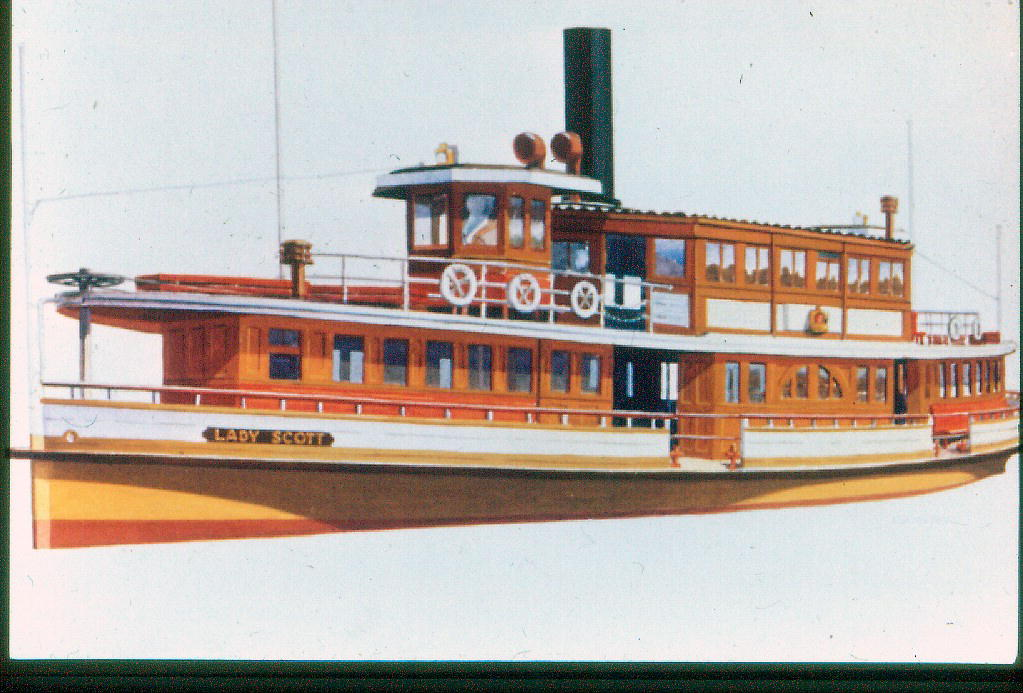
Illustration of Lady Scott's original livery including varnished timber

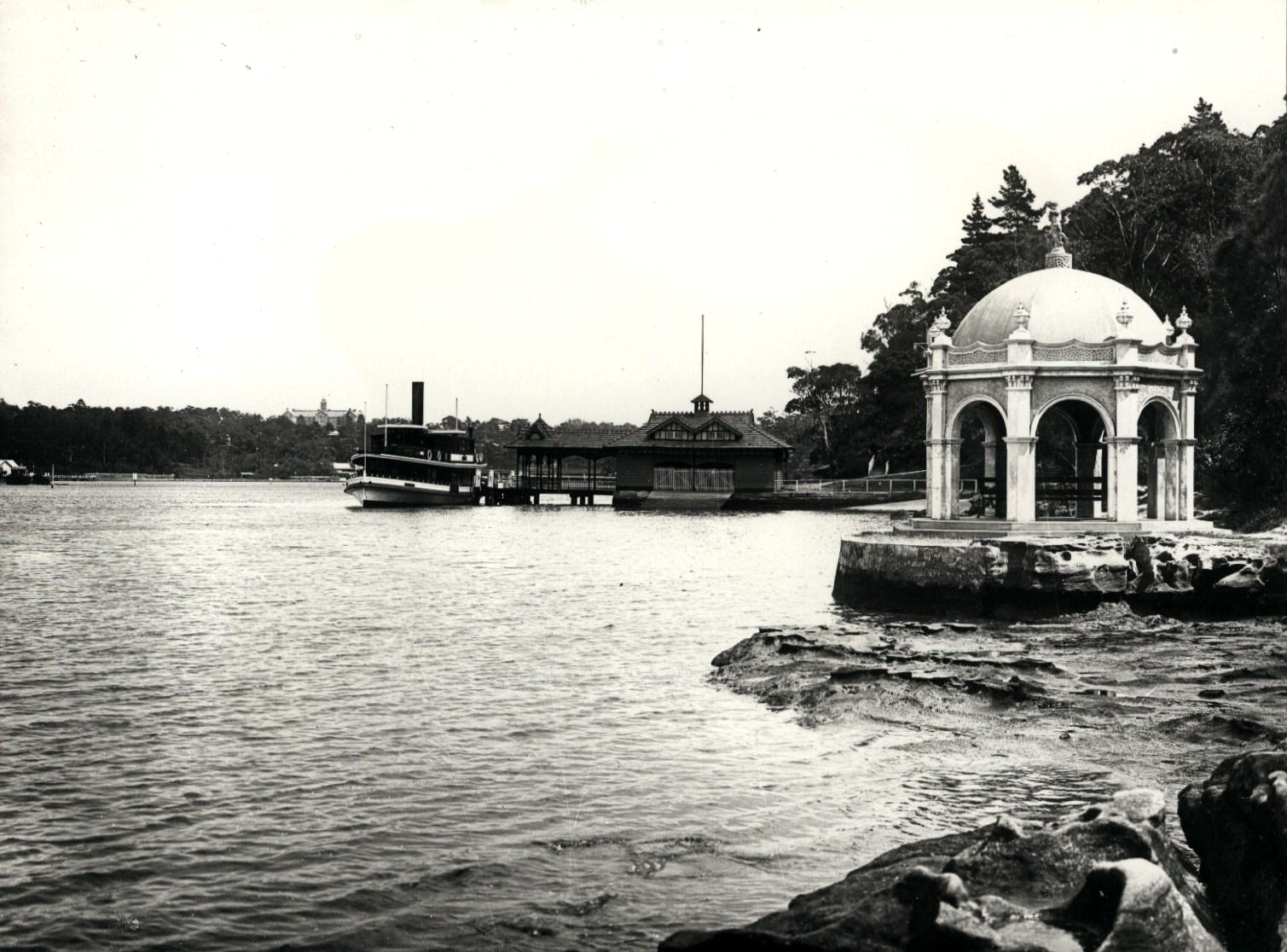
At Riverview College wharf, 1915

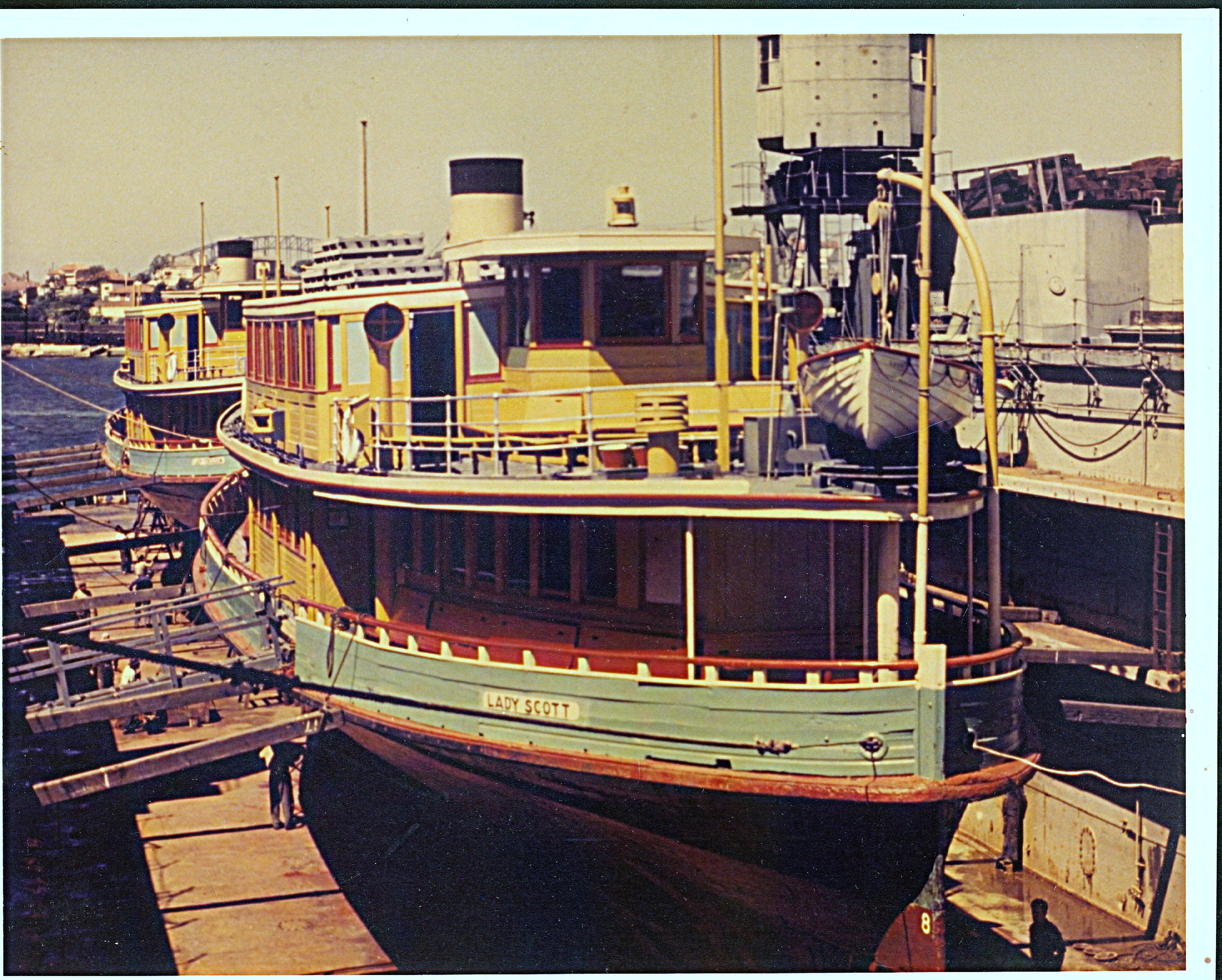
Dry docked 1960s in her 1937 yellow and green livery and short diesel funnel.

== Post ferry career ==
In 1969, Lady Scott suffered major engine troubles on a Mosman to Circular Quay run after which she was laid up at the Balmain ferry base. With her hull also in need of refastening, the State Government put her up for sale. Her buyers intended to use her as a cruise ferry on the Hawkesbury River north of Sydney, however, her draught was too deep for that area.

She was converted to a cruise vessel, painted blue and white, fitted with a small high-revving diesel engine, and her aft wheelhouse turned into galley. She cruised around Sydney Harbour with little commercial success. While tied up for the weekend at Rodd Island, she caught fire and burnt to the waterline on 6 November 1972. With her hull relatively undamaged, her superstructure was rebuilt over two years with a new modern appearance. Her part owner, Geoff D'Albora, had planned to call her Aqua Queen in line with his smaller boat Aqua Princess, however, she was re-commissioned as John Cadman. Following a considerable commercial success, she was sold in the 2000s and renamed Harbour Queen, however, this cruising venture was not as successful. She sank at Blackwattle Bay around 2014 and was broken up.

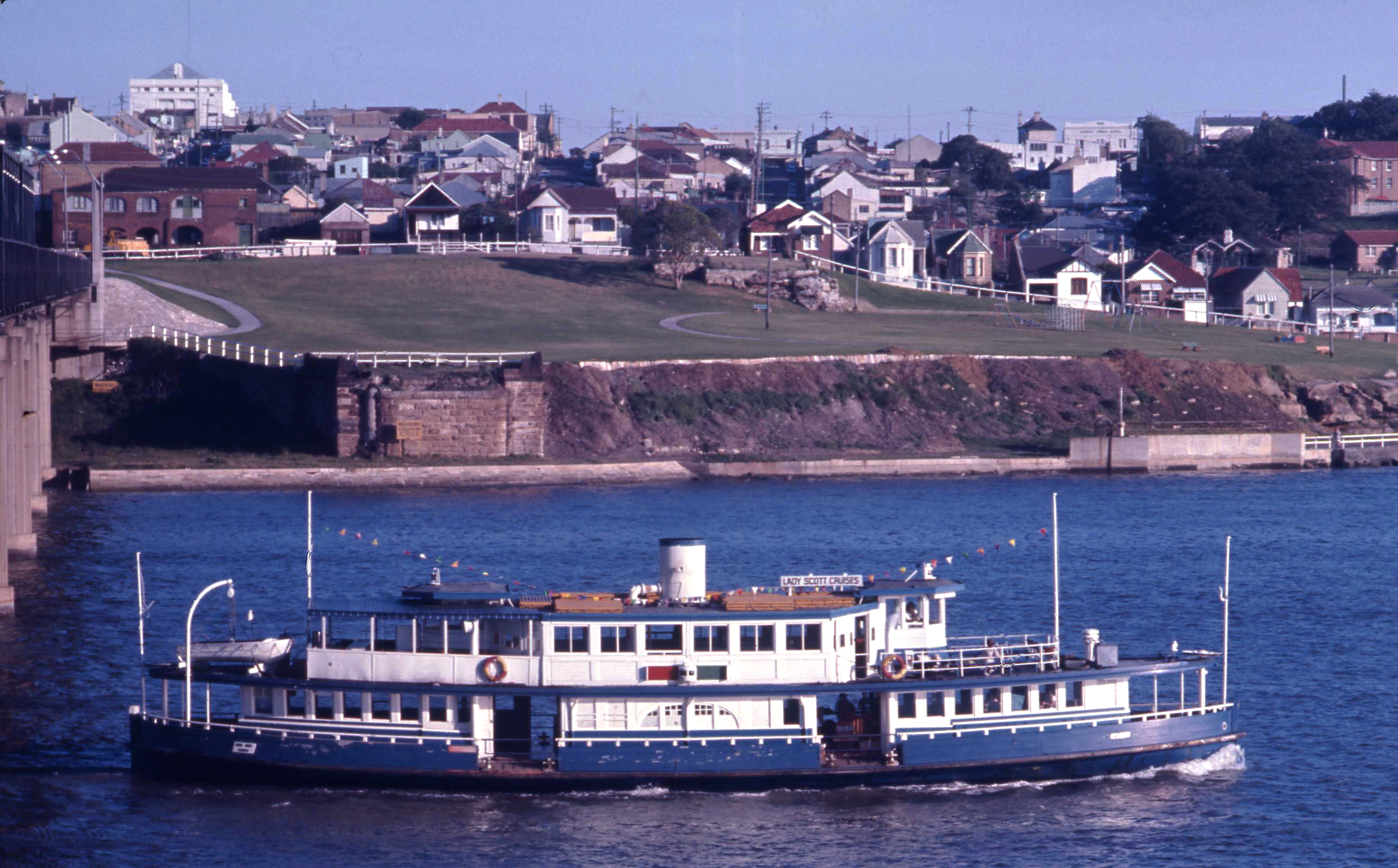
In her original cruise boat guise, prior to the 1972 fire

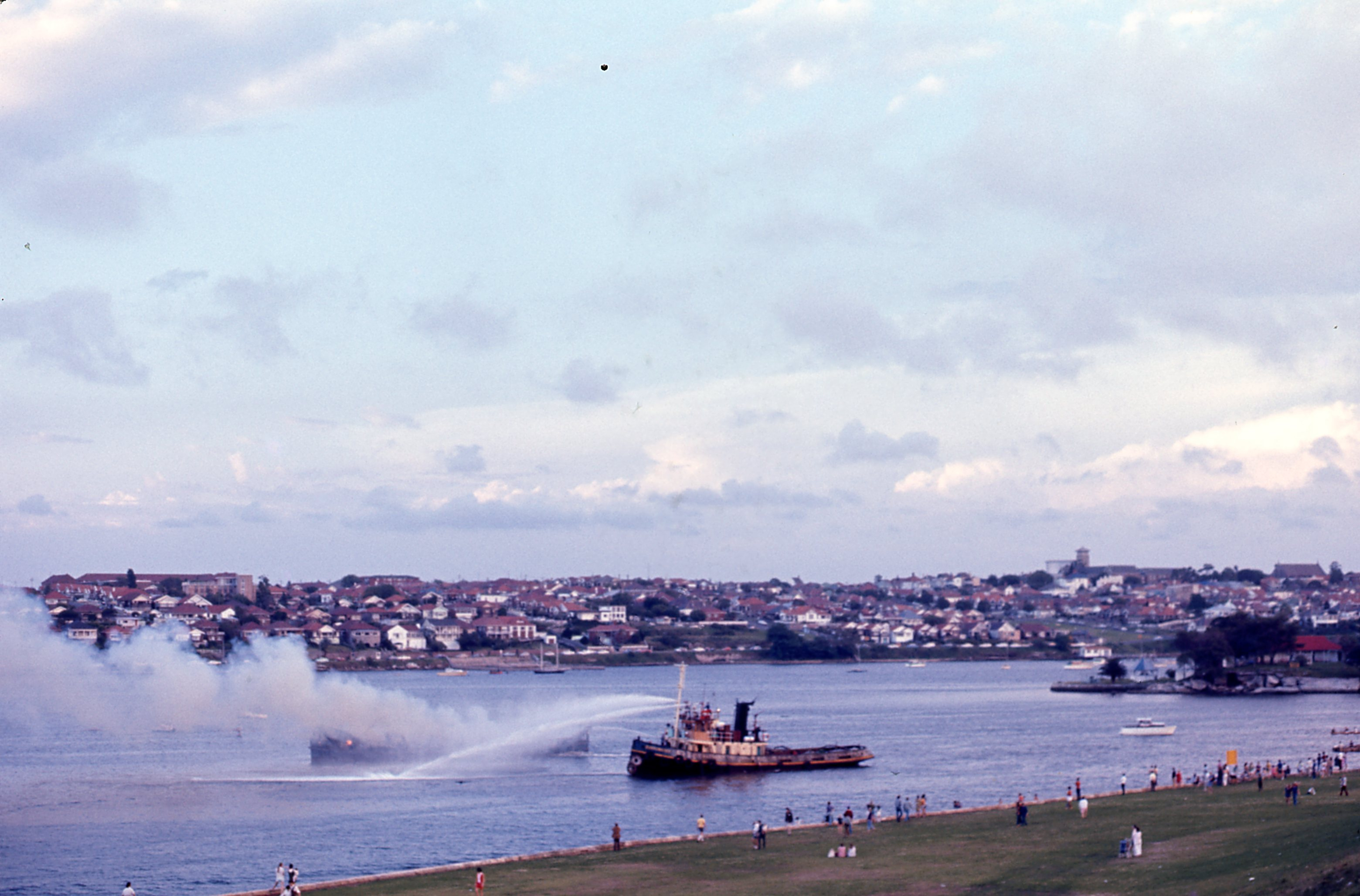
On fire off Drummoyne, 6 November 1972

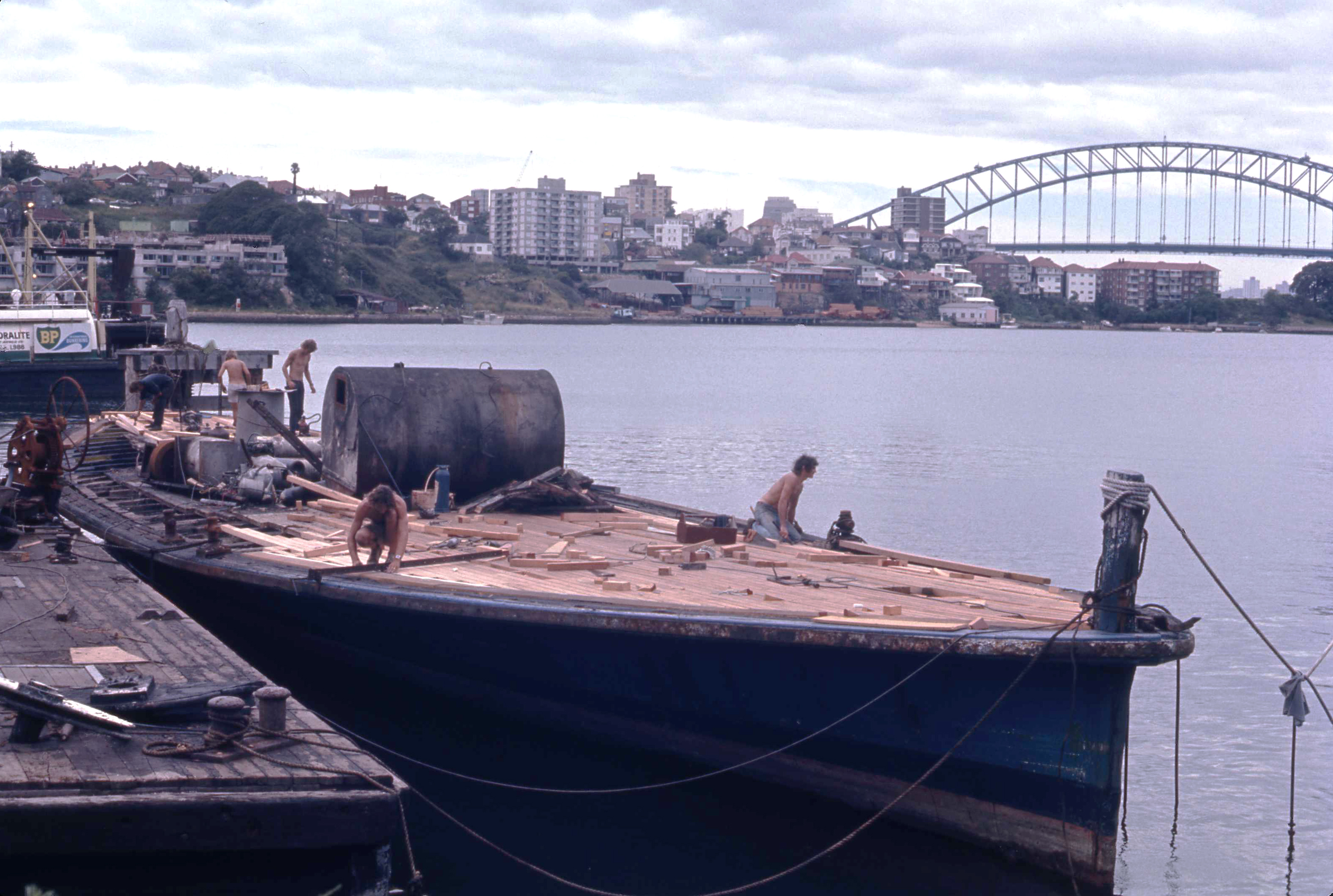
Being redecked after the 1972 fire that destroyed her superstructure.

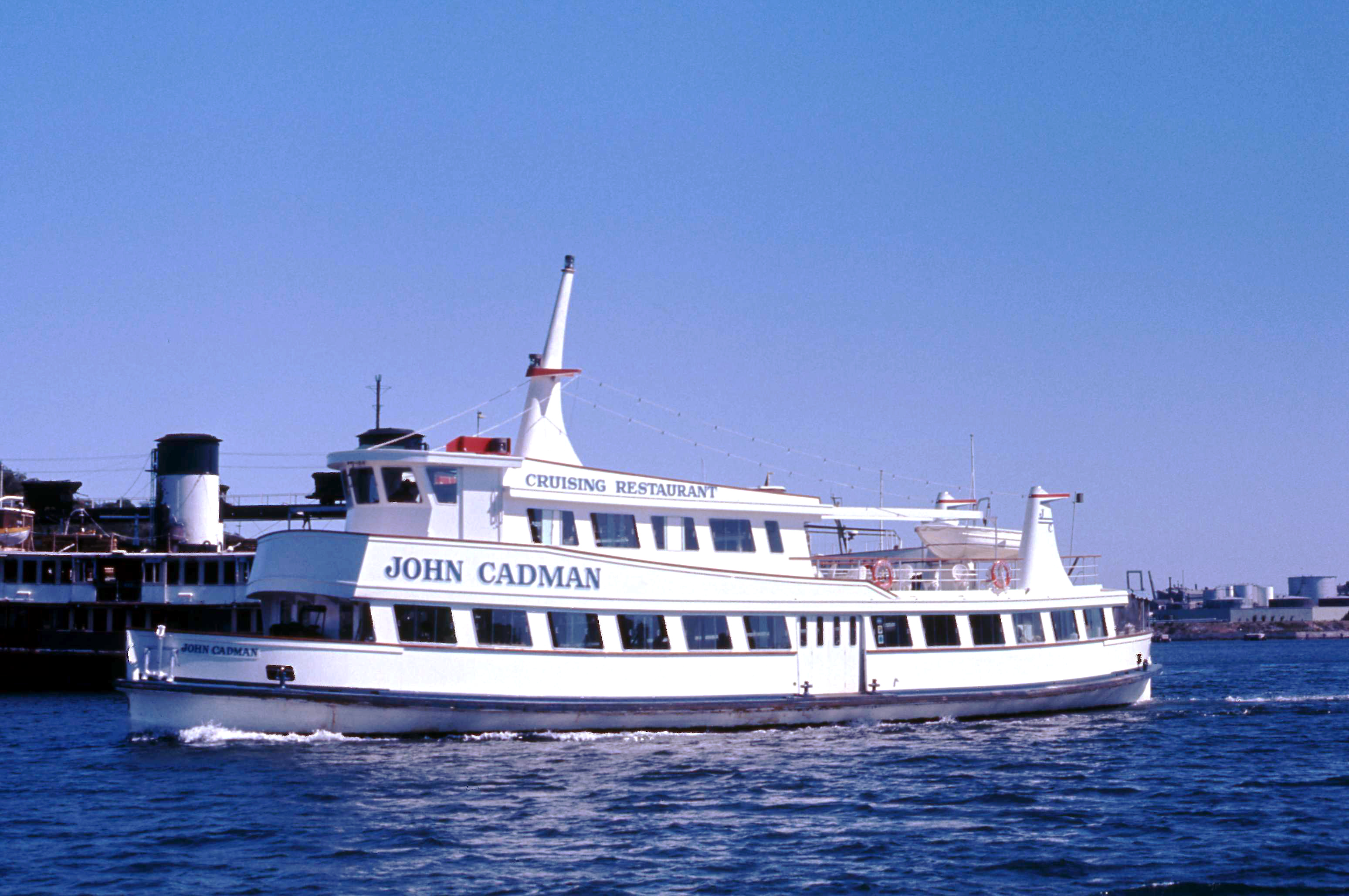
Rebuilt as the John Cadman cruising restaurant

Lady Chelmsford, the first built of the five, was sold in 1969 and rebuilt as a show boat in Adelaide. She was sold to Melbourne interests in 1985 where she was used as a cruise boat. She sank at her moorings in 2008 and was broken up in 2011. By the 1970s, Lady Ferguson was being used as a spare ferry on Sydney Harbour. She was towed to Hobart with Kosciusko in 1975 to assist following the collapse of the Tasman Bridge however she was found to be in too poor condition and was scrapped. Lady Denman was pulled from ferry service in 1979 following the introduction that year of the new Lady Street. She is now on permanent land display at Huskisson on the New South Wales south coast. Lady Edeline was the longest serving as a Sydney ferry being decommissioned in 1984 with the remaining wooden K-class ferries following the Karrabee's sinking earlier that year. She was laid up on the Parramatta River and sank into the mud in 1988. Of the five, only Lady Denman is still extant.

== See also ==
- List of Sydney Harbour ferries
