= Lady Chelmsford =

Lady-class ferry that operated on Sydney Harbour

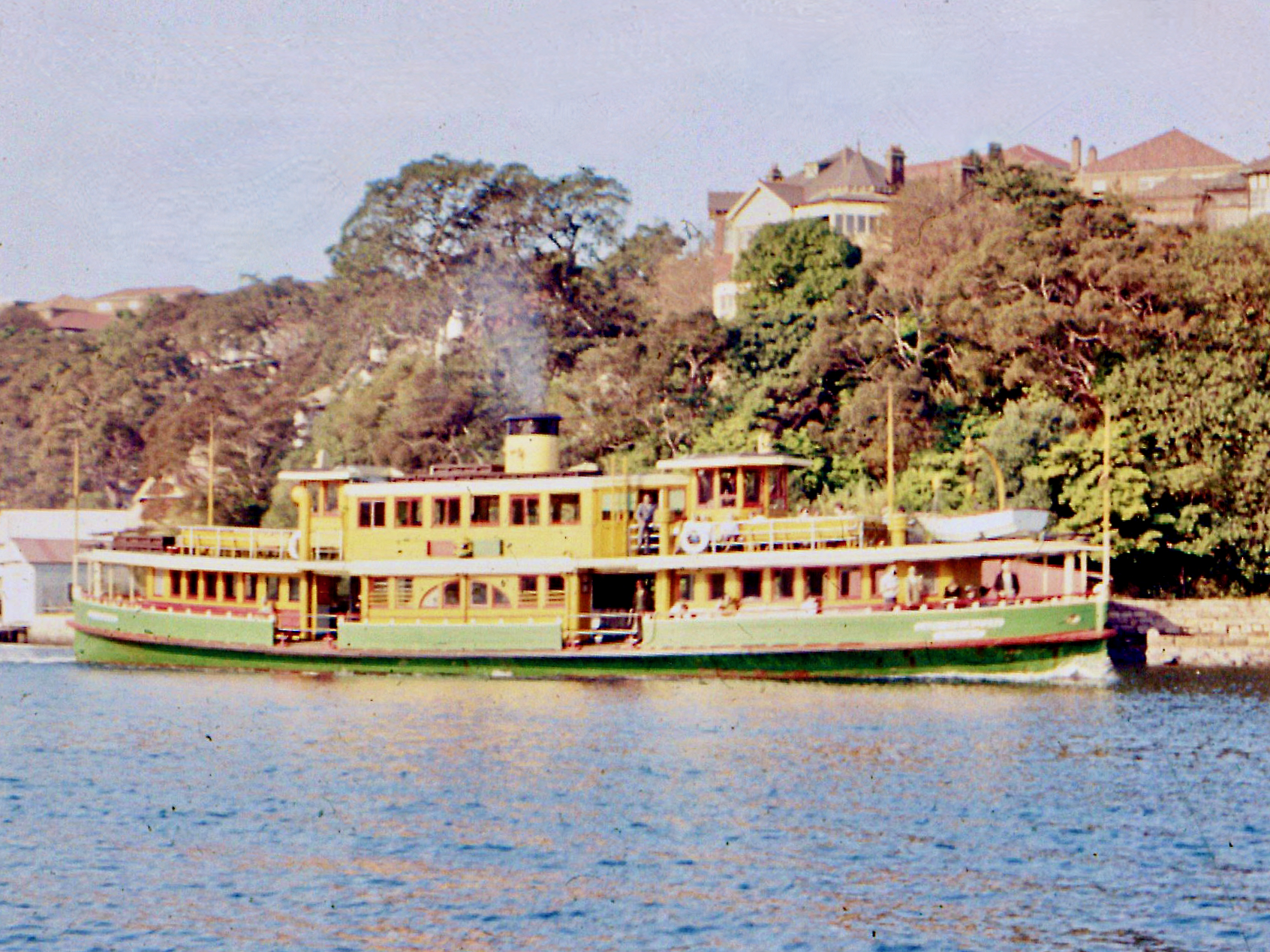
- Lady Chelmsford as a diesel vessel in Mosman Bay, 1961

History

Australia
- Name: Lady Chelmsford
- Namesake: Frances Thesiger, Viscountess Chelmsford
- Operator: Balmain New Ferry Company; Sydney Ferries Limited; Sydney Harbour Transport Board
- Builder: Rock Davis, Blackwall, New South Wales
- Launched: 14 April 1910
- Out of service: 1971
- Fate: Sank at her moorings 2008, broken up 2011

General characteristics
- Class & type: Lady-class ferry, 3rd series
- Displacement: 98 t (96 long tons; 108 short tons)
- Length: 110 ft (34 m)
- Beam: 9.80 ft (2.99 m)
- Height: 24.70 ft (7.53 m)
- Speed: 10 kn (19 km/h; 12 mph); 11 kn (20 km/h; 13 mph) (from 1957)
- Capacity: 446

Lady Chelmsford was a Sydney Harbour ferry built in 1910 for the Balmain New Ferry Company. She and four similar ferries, Lady Denman (1912), Lady Edeline (1913), Lady Ferguson (1914), and Lady Scott (1914), were a new series of "Lady-class" ferries designed by naval architect Walter Reeks.

Lady Chelmsford and her four sisters survived the 1932 opening of the Sydney Harbour Bridge and were converted to diesel power that decade. They also survived the 1951 NSW State Government takeover of the ailing ferry fleet.

Sold out of ferry service in 1971, Lady Chelmsford was rebuilt as a showboat in Adelaide and from 1985 she was used as a showboat in Melbourne. She sank at her moorings in Melbourne in 2008 and was broken up in 2011.

== Design and construction ==
From 1900, the Balmain New Ferry Company began a period of expansion to keep up and compete with the tram network that was expanding into what is now referred to as Sydney's Inner West. Older ferries were sold off, and several series of "Lady-class" ferries were introduced.

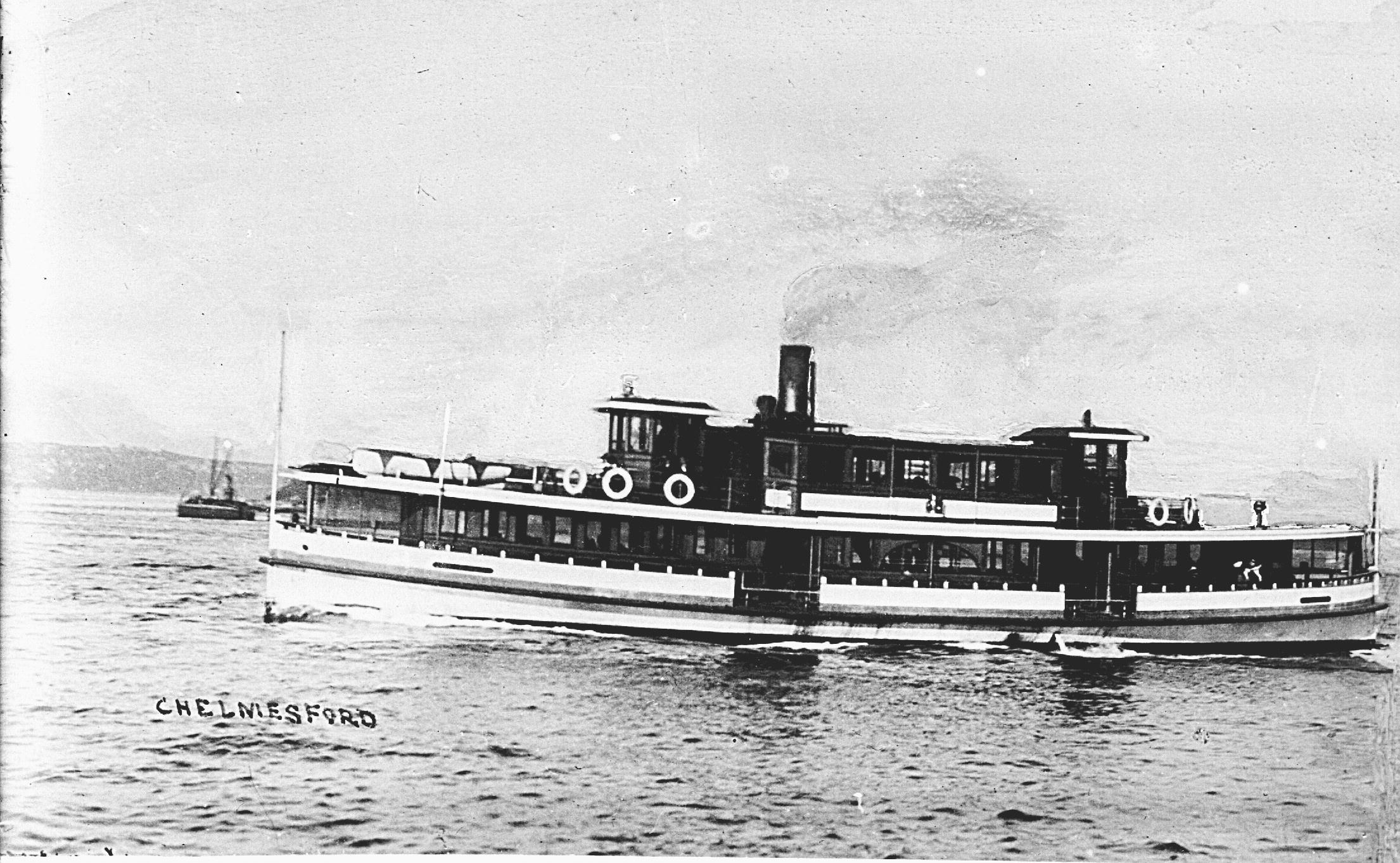
Lady Chelmsford in her original condition

Lady Chelmsford was built by 1914 by shipbuilder Rock Davis at Blackwall in Brisbane Water. Launched on 14 April 1910, the new ferry was towed to Sydney where Morrison and Sinclair of White Bay, Balmain, fitted her boiler and a compound engine, and built her superstructure.

Sisters Lady Denman and Lady Scott were built by J Dent of Huskisson, and Lady Edeline by G A Washington of Annandale. With construction of a Sydney Harbour Bridge seeming likely, she and her four sisters were designed for a maximum of fifteen years of life. Instead, the five would serve on the harbour for at least 60 years, with Lady Scott operating as a ferry until 1969 then as a cruise boat being broken up in 2014. Because they were intended to have a limited life-span, they were lightly built and almost austere in their fittings, such as roofs of galvanised iron. The five were relatively small and had a veed shape and shallow draft to navigate the muddy and silted upper reaches of their upstream runs. At 98 t, Lady Chelmsford was the largest of the five by a small margin, with the other four between 95 and 96 ton. As built, she had a much smaller smoke stack than her four sisters.

In common with most Sydney Harbour ferries at the time, Lady Chelmsford and her four sisters were wooden double-ended screw steamers. The five ferries had only a single propeller at one end that pushed the vessels in one direction and pulled them in the other, an arrangement favoured by Walter Reeks. This feature was introduced by the ferry's designer, Walter Reeks, on a previous Balmain company ferry, Lady Rawson of 1906. The configuration contrasted with the double-ended vessels of Sydney Ferries Limited (the K-class ferries) which had a continuous propeller shaft and a screw at each end. A single propeller and one shaft simplified the internal arrangements and put less stress on the timber hulls compared to shafts running a propeller at either end. Apart from some unusual handling characteristics, the single-propeller configuration was a success and Reeks unsuccessfully tried to patent it.

Along with Lady Denman (1912), Lady Scott hull was built by J Dent, of Husskisson on Jervis Bay, from local timbers. Lady Scott was launched on 4 November at Huskisson and christened by Miss Roderick, daughter of one of the Directors of the Balmain New Ferry Co. The vessel was towed to Sydney to receive her machinery supplied by McKie & Baxter of Glasgow. The engines were compound 2-cylinder (12" and 24" x 18"), 24 hp (nominal), 160 hp (indicated). She had one boiler of 12 lb pressure and a 7-ton bunker capacity. Her maximum speed was 11.5 knots. Other finishing works was also carried out in Sydney. Lady Chelmsford was built by Brisbane Water shipbuilder Rock Davis, Lady Edeline by G A Washington of Annandale, and Lady Ferguson by David Drake of Balmain.

== Service history ==
Lady Chelmsford was the first of five in the Balmain's company's final series of "Lady-class" ferries introduced to replace the single-ended ferries on the Lane Cove River service.

Lady Chelmsford, and the rest of the Balmain fleet, was bought by Sydney Ferries Limited as part of its takeover of the Balmain company on 1 March 1918. The five Lady ferries operated the Lane Cove River services to Fig Tree until 12 November 1931 when weekday services were suspended. They ran weekend services to Fig Tree on weekends until 2 September 1945. Lane Cove River services were discontinued altogether on 10 November 1950, after which the five saw them work the Parramatta River and across other routes. Sydney Ferries Limited ran a service to Balmain until it was taken over in 1939 by Nicholson Brothers Harbour Transport Company with their own ferries. The five "Lady class" ferries were run on other routes across the harbour.

In 1932, the Sydney Harbour Bridge was opened, and Sydney Ferries Limited's annual patronage dropped from 40 million to about 15 million. As part of economy measures, most older and/or larger steamers were put up for sale.

In 1933, Lady Chelmsford was the first Sydney Ferries Limited vessel to be converted to diesel. The new two-stroke Gardiner diesel engine provided 190 hp (141 kW) and pushed her to 10.3 knots. Her operational crew was reduced from five to three, and she could run for nearly three weeks without refuelling. With the modernisation deemed a success, the remaining four Lady-class ferries, as well as K-class ferries Karingal and Karrabee were similarly converted to diesel power during the 1930s.

Facing uncertain times, Sydney Ferries Limited sought a refreshed look for their ferries, painting over the original livery of varnished timber and white trim with a scheme of yellow and green with a red trim. The five "Lady" ferries continued to run the Hunters Hill and Balmain services. The post-Bridge drop in demand for the ferry fleet was somewhat mitigated as many could not afford their own transport in the Great Depression of the 1930s and rationing of fuel during World War 2 made the coal required for the steam ferries relatively cheap.

However, the post World War II years saw the drop in demand pick up pace. In 1951, with annual patronage down to 9 million, the NSW State Government took over Sydney Ferries Limited and its remaining fleet and assets. The ferries, including Lady Chelmsford and her four sister ships, became assets of the Sydney Harbour Transport Board. The Port Jackson & Manly Steamship Company, which ran the Manly service, was paid to run the services. The services and fleet were quickly rationalised with most of the larger remaining timber K-class steamers being decommissioned. However, the five relatively small and economical "Lady-class" ferries were retained. Throughout the remainder of the 1950s and into the 1960s, they became the back-bone of Sydney Harbour's non-Manly ferry fleet, along with Karingal and Karrabee the smallest of the K-class ferries. Their routes were expanded to all inner-harbour (ie, non-Manly) services including Taronga Park Zoo, Milsons Point, Cremorne and Hunters Hill.

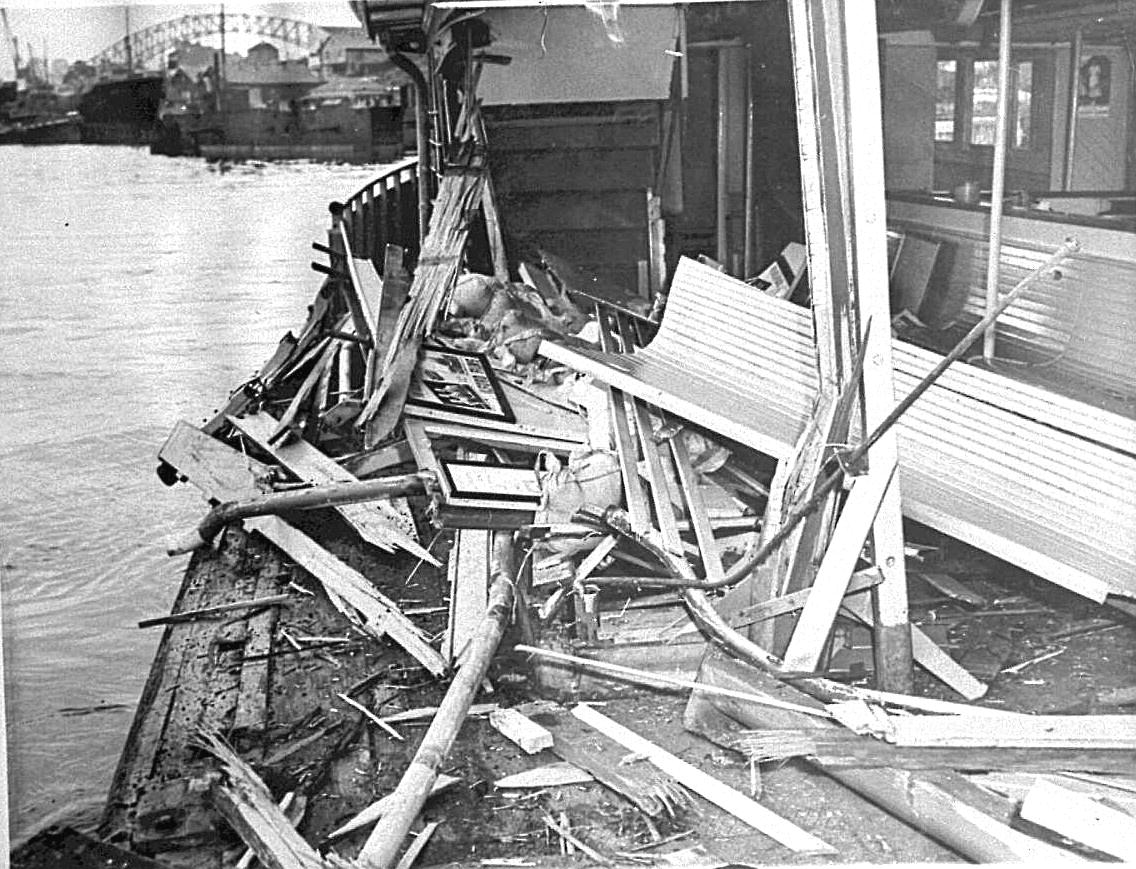
Damage to Lady Chelmsford after a collision with Kameruka in 1958.

On 11 November 1950, Lady Chelmsford operated the last Lane Cove River ferry service, departing Circular Quay at 6:30 pm with 70 passengers on board for Longueville. On 6 April 1958, she collided with Kameruka suffering substantial damage to her lower deck super structure.

The five sister ferries (except Lady Scott) were re-engined again in the late 1950s and early 1960s. Lady Chelmsford was the second, receiving in 1957 a 300 bhp, 4-cylinder Crossley Brothers diesel that pushed her to 11 knots.

Lady Chelmsford off Cremorne Point in 1970

== Post-ferry career ==
After smashing her bow in a collision with Long Nose Point Wharf in August 1970, she was taken out of service. Needing a lot of work, she was sold in August 1971 to an Adelaide syndicate who sailed her to Port Adelaide. Over fifteen months, and for $130,000, she was re-purposed to a showboat with her aft wheelhouse being removed. She was provided with a timber dance floor on the bottom deck and a galley upstairs where the aft wheelhouse had been. Air conditioning was added to the engine room, which was painted white. The engine was painted bright yellow with chrome and copper fittings with soft white pile carpet on the floor. She served in this role there until being replaced by a purpose-built vessel in 1985, and Lady Chelmsford was sold again to Bill Leahy for use as a cursing restaurant in Melbourne.

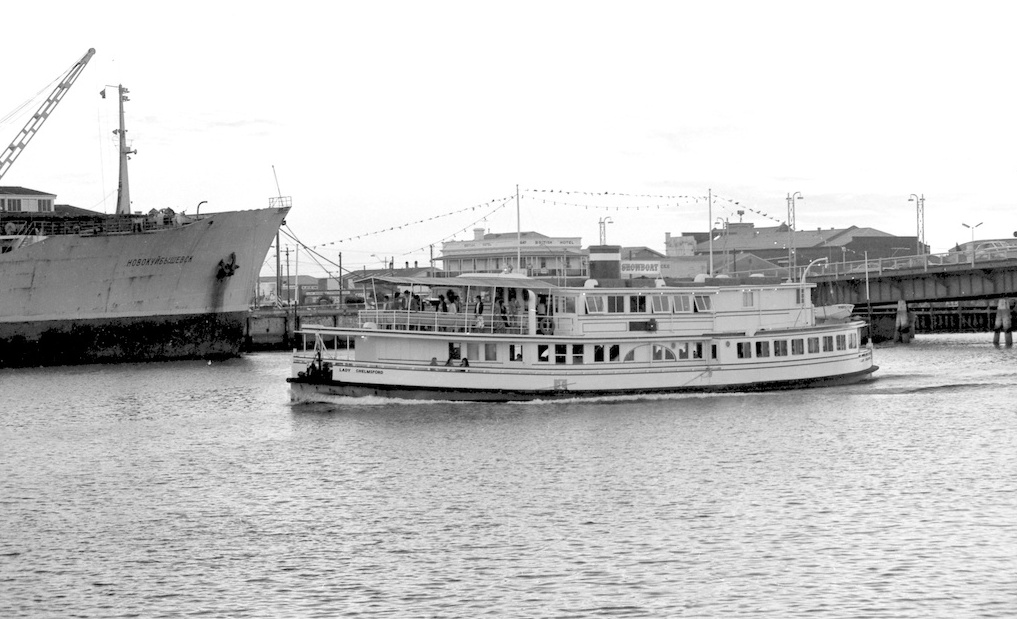
Lady Chelmsford in use as a showboat in Adelaide

On 6 December 2002, Lady Chelmsford was involved in a collision with the moored cabin cruiser Rob Roy, resulting in minor damage to both ships but no injuries.

In 2005, she was out of survey, taken out of service and sold. In 2007, she was sold again to her first Melbourne owners and returned to a static dining experience. In February 2008, Lady Chelmsford sank at her moorings in Melbourne having almost sunk in early 2007. Due to her fragile structural integrity and salvaging cost, she was broken up on site in June 2011.

Lady Scott was sold in 1969 and used as a cruise boat. A 1972 fire destroyed her superstructure and she was re-built as the John Cadman cruising restaurant. She was sold to new owners, renamed Harbour Queen, and in 2014 sank and was broken. Lady Ferguson was towed to Hobart with Kosciusko in 1975 to assist following the collapse of the Tasman Bridge, however, she was found to be in too poor condition and was scrapped. Lady Denman was pulled from ferry service in 1979 following the introduction that year of the new Lady Street. She is now on permanent land display at Huskisson on the New South Wales south coast. Lady Edeline was the longest serving as a Sydney ferry being decommissioned in 1984 with the remaining wooden K-class ferries following the Karrabee's sinking earlier that year. She was laid up on the Parramatta River and sank into the mud in 1988. Of the five, only Lady Denman is still extant.

== See also ==
- List of Sydney Harbour ferries
