= Kuramia =

Passenger steam ship

Coordinates: 34.990430°S 151.584120°E

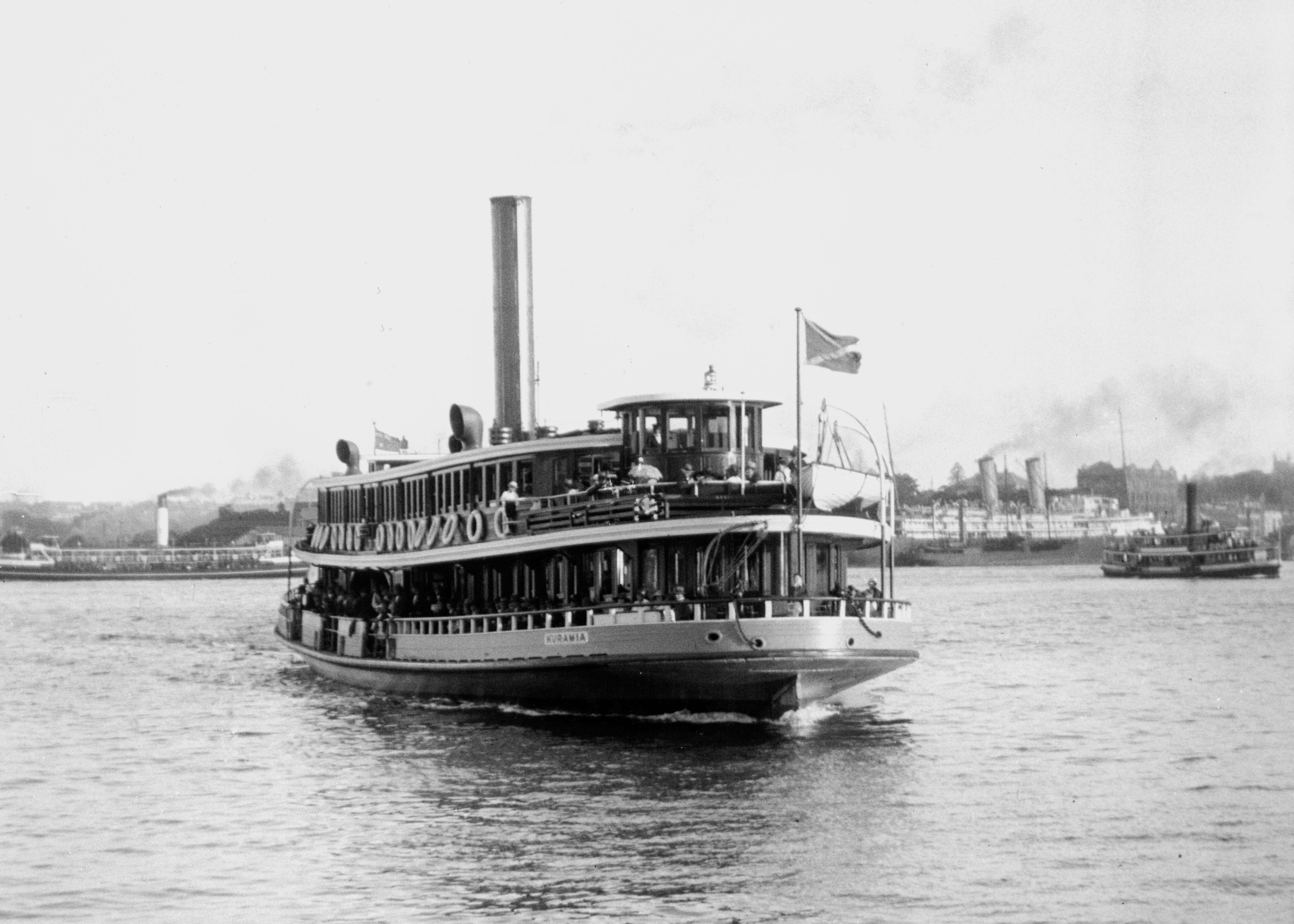
- Kuramia near Milsons Point

History

Australia
- Name: Kuramia
- Owner: Sydney Ferries Limited
- Builder: David Drake, Balmain
- Cost: £20,027
- Launched: 7 November 1913
- In service: 1914
- Out of service: 1932
- Identification: O/N: 136383

General characteristics
- Type: Harbour ferry
- Tonnage: 353 GT
- Length: 170 ft (52 m)
- Beam: 35 ft (11 m)
- Propulsion: Triple expansion engine built by Mort's Dock & Engineering Company, Balmain

Australia
- Name: HMAS Kuramia
- Owner: Royal Australian Navy
- Commissioned: 20 February 1942
- Decommissioned: December 1945
- Identification: UK official number: 136383
- Fate: Sunk as a target 10 October 1953

Kuramia was a K-class ferry on Sydney Harbour. Commissioned in 1914, the timber-hulled steamer was built for Sydney Ferries Limited during the early twentieth boom in cross-harbour ferry travel. At 353 tons, she was the largest wooden ferry on Sydney Harbour.

She was a typical example of the K class; a group of double-deck, double-ended, steam-powered screw ferries.

Kuramia was built for the short but busy cross-harbour route between Circular Quay and Milsons Point. Made redundant by the 1932 opening of the Sydney Harbour Bridge, the Royal Australian Navy converted her to a boom defence vessel.

Kuramia followed Sydney Ferries Limited's tradition of naming their vessels after Australian Indigenous words starting with "K". Kuramia was reported to have been named after a village on the Transcontinental railway route.

== Background ==
Kuramia was built for Sydney Ferries Limited during the early twentieth century boom in cross-Harbour travel prior to the 1932 opening of the Sydney Harbour Bridge. She was typical of a broader type of timber double-ended screw ferry known as the K class. The company built 25 of these vessels between the 1890s and early 1920s to meet the booming demand. The K class were all propelled by triple expansion steam engines and were predominantly timber-hulled (four later K-class had steel hulls).

== Design and construction ==
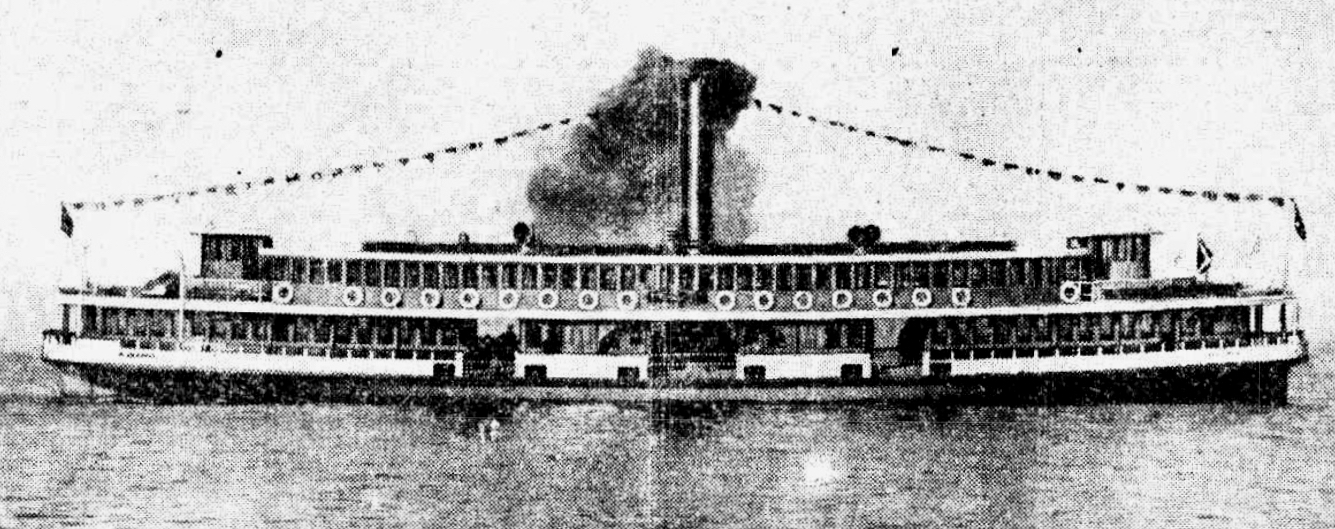
Kuramia on her trials, 14 July 1914

Kuramia was designed by J Darter, under the supervision of T Drown, Sydney Ferries Limited works manager. The vessel had six longitudinal bulkheads to improve her strength and safety.

Kuramia was built by David Drake, Balmain for Sydney Ferries Limited at a cost of £20,027. She was 170 ft (52 m) long with a beam of 35 ft (11 m) compared to the previously largest ferry, Kaikai with a length of 152 ft (46 m). She was launched on 15 November 1913 and christened Kuramia by Miss Ina Cornish.

Her triple expansion, direct-acting, surface-condensing steam engines were built by Mort's Dock & Engineering Company, Balmain. There were two multi-tubular boilers 7 feet 7 ½ inch in diameter, and 18 feet and 7 ½ inches long and the trial trip indicated 670 hp. The electric lighting was provided by Messrs. Lawrence and Hansen.

== Service history ==
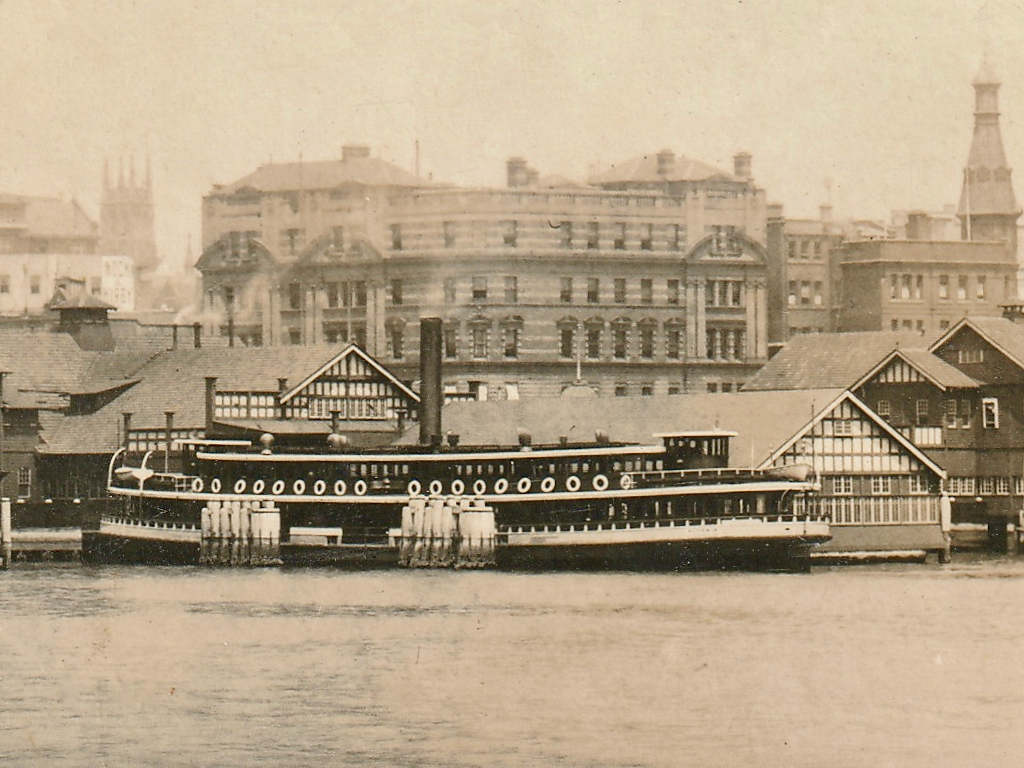
At Circular Quay, circa 1920

Her official trails were undertaken on 14 July 1914 where she attained a speed of 12 knots.

Kuramia at 335 tons, and Kulgoa (338 tons), were the largest wooden ferries on Sydney Harbour, and to that point, the largest built for Sydney Ferries Limited. With a passenger capacity of 1,357, she was the highest capacity inner-harbour (non-Manly) ferry until the twins, Koompartoo and Kuttabul of 1922 (Kulgoa could carry 1,255).

She was operated on the Circular Quay to Milsons Point run, joining the regular ferries on that route, Kulgoa (1905) and Kaikai (1907). With three ferries, the service increased from a ferry every 10 minutes, to one every 6 minutes. Kuramia, Kulgoa and Kuttabul being three of the largest of the Sydney Ferries Fleet were used to capacity as spectator vessels to witness the 1925 arrival of the American Fleet in Sydney Harbour.

Made redundant by the opening of the Sydney Harbour Bridge in 1932. Her engines were sold in 1940.

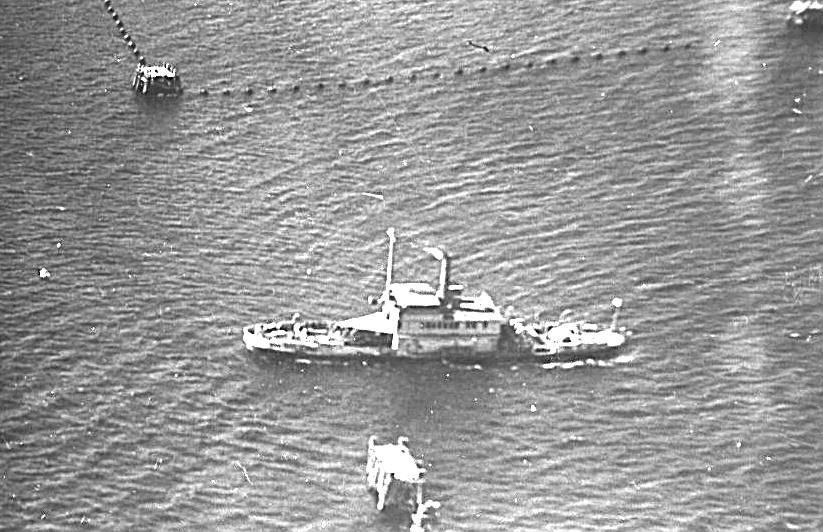
Converted to and in use as a boom-gate vessel near Watsons Bay

Part of her machinery was fitted into HMAS Uralba. Her hull was requisitioned by the Royal Australian Navy in 1942 and she was converted to a boom defence vessel for naval use in 1942 as a boom gate vessel on the harbour boom off Watsons Bay until the end of World War II, being removed from the boom in October 1945. For a few months after the end of World War II she remained in use as a dormitory and amenities ship before finally being paid off in December 1945.

Her hulk was used as target by aircraft from HMAS Sydney and sunk 17 miles off Sydney's Macquarie Lighthouse on 10 October 1953.

== Incidents ==
- 7 June 1915 - Kuramia's upper deck collided with stays of the Gladesville Bridge when returning from a regatta. The wheelhouse and a portion of the roof were severely damaged, however, no injuries were report.
- 5 May 1923 - Upon returning from the Head of the River rowing regatta, Kuramia crashed into the Gladesville Bridge after being taken off course by the current. Striking a buttress, the collision caused a large beam to crash into the smoking saloon. Two girls and a man were injured, with one girl later having her leg amputated.

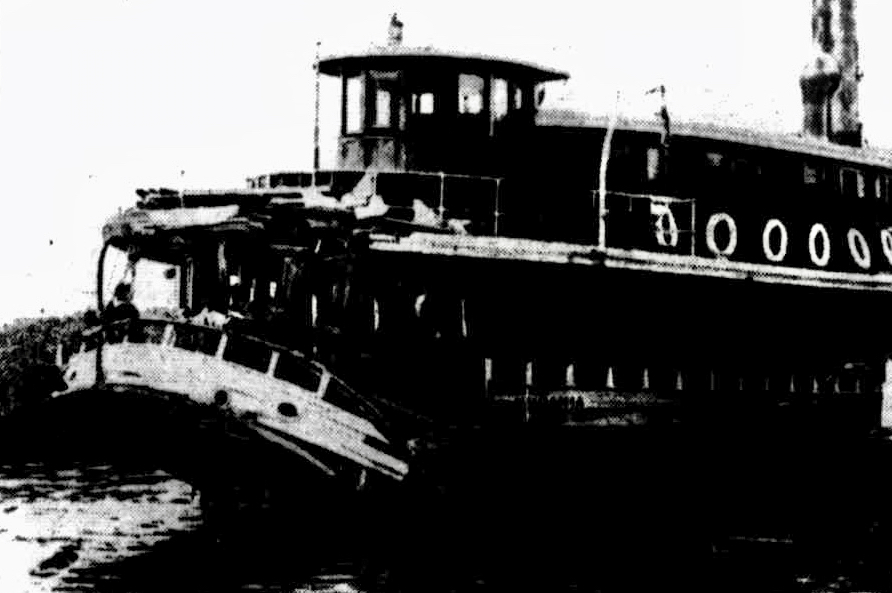
After collision with Kulgoa - 1925

- On 22 February 1924, Kuramia crashed into the pontoon of Milsons Point wharf during a busy evening peak run from Circular Quay. One passenger was taken to hospital with a broken right leg, and others were treated at the scene. The bulwarks and anchor box were smashed. A strong wind was blowing and the ferry was estimated to be carrying between 1,500 and 2,000 people, thus, it was speculated making it difficult to manoeuvre the vessel.
- In June 1925, she collided with Kulgoa of Dawes Point. An August 1925 Marine Court of Inquiry did not find anyone culpably negligent. The court found that the Lane Cove ferry The Lady Mary, hid the larger ferries Kuramia and Kulgoa from each other until Kulgoa was abreast of The Lady Mary until a collision between the larger two was inevitable. No injuries occurred due to the crew being able to clear passengers from the forward of Kuramia. Both vessels suffered significant damage to their bows, with Kuramia's smoking cabin also smashed in. Damage Kulgoa was estimated at £175 and £560 to Kuramia.
- On 1 February 1926, Kuramia collided with the steamer Wear and was badly damaged on the port side. Damage was estimated to be worth £130, but there were no injuries. Deck planks, belting, rail, stanchion and bulwarks were destroyed, and a hole was also pierced in her within 18 inches of the water-line. The Wear was only mildly damaged and was able to continue on her voyage to Newcastle.
- On 21 September 1929, Kuramia collided with Koree. The former was reported to have suffered no damage, while damage to the latter was around £40.
- 5 June 1930 - Kuramia collided with the launch Engadine off Milsons Point, the latter of which partially sank in shallow water. Four men on the launch were able to safely board Kuramia while the Engadine was beached. Kuramia's rudder was damaged.
