= Lady Ferguson =

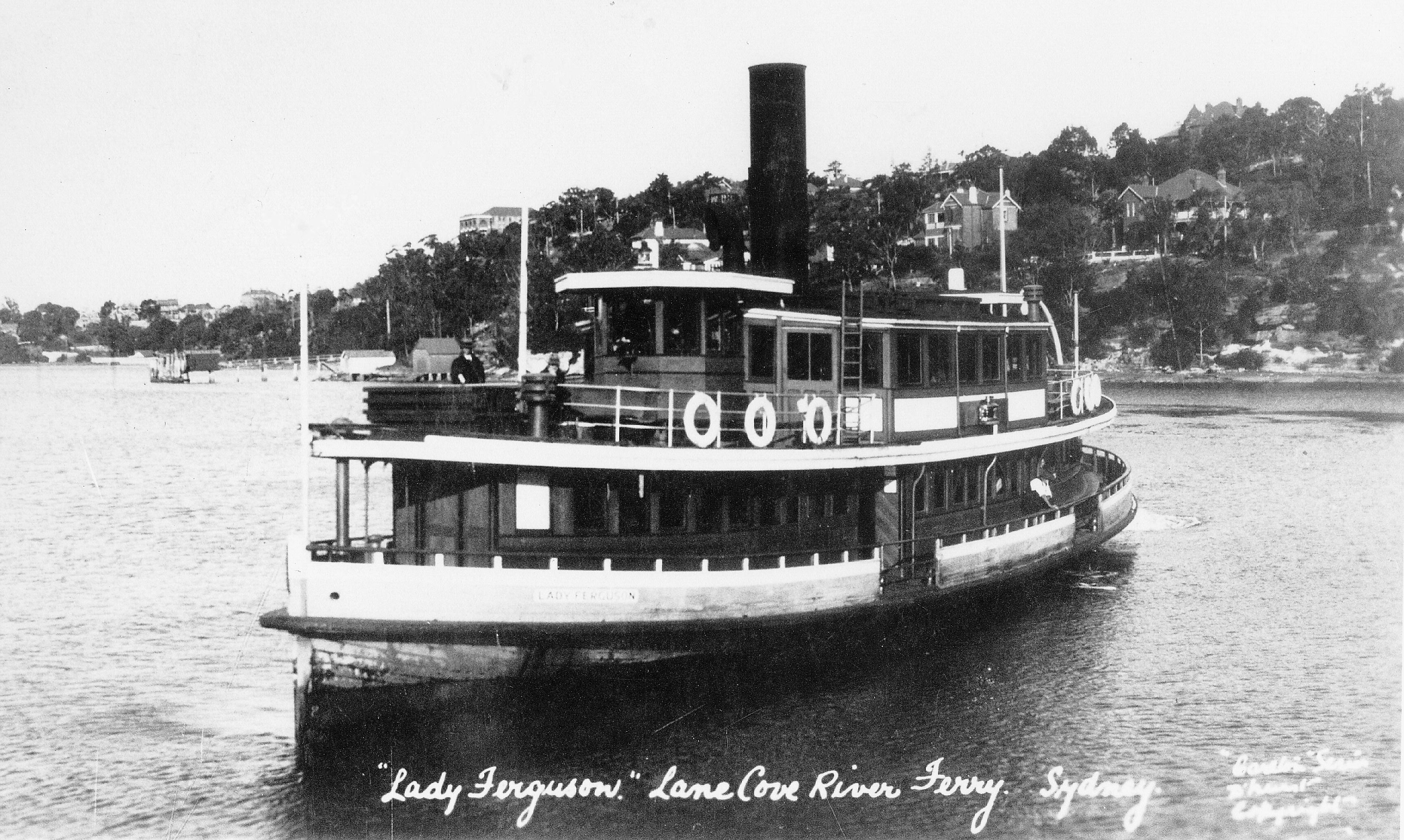
- As a steamer on the Lane Cove River, 1920s

History
- Name: Lady Ferguson
- Namesake: Helen Munro Ferguson, Viscountess Novar
- Operator: Balmain New Ferry Company; Sydney Ferries Limited; Sydney Harbour Transport Board
- Builder: David Drake Limited, Balmain
- Launched: 1914
- Out of service: 1974
- Fate: Sold to Hobart 1975, broken up 1977

General characteristics
- Tonnage: 95 tons, 97 tons from 1954
- Length: 33.5 m
- Propulsion: Steam (1914-1937), Diesel (from 1937)
- Speed: 11 knots as built, 9 knots as diesel
- Capacity: 560

Lady Ferguson was a Sydney Harbour ferry built in 1914 for the Balmain New Ferry Company. She and four similar ferries, Lady Chelmsford (1910), Lady Denman (1912), Lady Edeline (1913), and Lady Scott (1914), were a new series of "Lady-class" ferries designed by naval architect Walter Reeks.

Lady Ferguson and her four sisters survived the 1932 opening of the Sydney Harbour Bridge and were converted to diesel power that decade. They also survived the 1951 NSW State Government takeover of the ailing ferry fleet. Lady Ferguson was sold out of Sydney ferry service in 1975 to be used as a relief vessel in Hobart following the collapse of the Tasman Bridge. On arrival, she was found to be in such poor condition that she was not used, and was subsequently broken up in 1977.

Continuing a Balmain Ferry Co convention of naming their ferries after the wives of Governors-General of Australia and Governors of NSW, Lady Ferguson was named after Helen Munro Ferguson, Viscountess Novar, wife of Ronald Munro Ferguson, 1st Viscount Novar the sixth Governor-General of Australia. This naming nomenclature was again used by the State Government harbour ferry operator with the introduction of 6 new "Lady-class ferries" in the 1960s and 1970s.

== Design and construction ==
In common with most Sydney Harbour ferries at the time, Lady Ferguson and her four sisters were wooden double-ended screw steamers. The five ferries had only a single propeller at one end that pushed the vessels in one direction and pulled them in the other. The configuration contrasted with the double-ended K-class ferries of Sydney Ferries Limited, which had a continuous propeller shaft and a screw at each end. This feature was introduced by the ferry's designer, Walter Reeks, on a previous Balmain company ferry, Lady Rawson of 1906. A single propeller and one shaft simplified the internal arrangements and put less stress on the timber hulls compared to shafts running a propeller at either end. Apart from some unusual handling characteristics, the single-propeller configuration was a success and Reeks unsuccessfully tried to patent it.

Lady Ferguson was built in 1914 by David Drake Limited of Balmain. Lady Denman and Lady Scott were built by J Dent of Huskisson, Lady Chelmsford was built by Brisbane Water shipbuilder Rock Davis, and Lady Edeline by G A Washington of Annandale.

With the construction of a Sydney Harbour Bridge seeming likely, she and her four sisters were designed for a maximum of fifteen years of life. Instead, she would go on operating on the harbour until 1979 with her four sisters having similarly long or even longer careers. Because they were to have a limited lifespan, they were lightly built and almost austere in their fittings, such as roofs of galvanised iron. They were relatively small and had a veed shape and shallow draft to navigate the muddy and silted upper reaches of their upstream runs.

Her original engines were 24 hp (nominal) compound steam engines by McKie and Baxter which pushed her to 11 knots.

== Service history ==
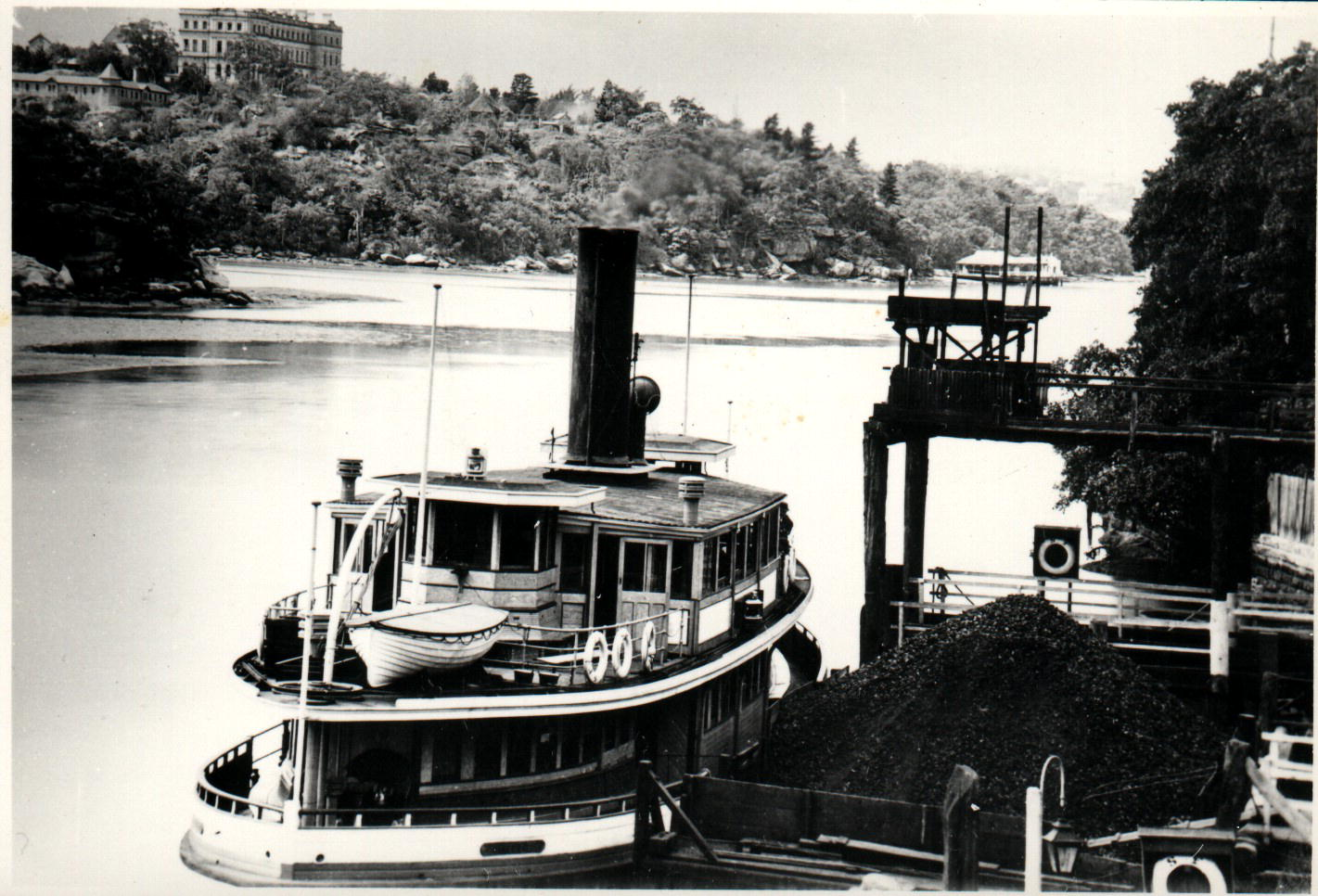
At Fig Tree wharf c 1915

From 1900, the Balmain New Ferry Company began a period of expansion to keep up and compete with the tram network expanding into what is now referred to as Sydney's Inner West. Older ferries were sold off including several series of "Lady-class" ferries were introduced.

Lady Ferguson was the last of five in the Balmain company's final series of "Lady-class" ferries, the others being Ladies Chelmsford (1910), Denman (1912), Edeline (1913), and Scott (1914). This series was introduced to replace the single-ended ferries on the Lane Cove River service. They also worked on the run from Balmain to Erskine Street wharf (at site of current Barangaroo).

Lady Ferguson, and the rest of the Balmain fleet, were bought by Sydney Ferries Limited as part of its take over of the Balmain company on 1 March 1918. The five operated the Lane Cove River services to Fig Tree until 12 November 1931 when weekday services were suspended. They ran weekend services to Fig Tree on weekends until 2 September 1945. Lane Cove River services were discontinued altogether on 10 November 1950, after which the five saw them work the Parramatta River and across other routes. Sydney Ferries ran a service to Balmain until it was taken over in 1939 by Nicholson Brothers Harbour Transport Company with their own ferries. The five "Lady class" ferries were run on other routes across the harbour.

In 1932, the Sydney Harbour Bridge was opened, and Sydney Ferries Limited's annual patronage dropped from 40 million to about 15 million. As part of economy measures, almost older and/or larger steamers were put up for sale, and the five "Lady-class" ferries were converted to diesel power in the 1930s with Lady Chelmsford first. Their tall black smoke stacks were replaced with short funnels. Facing uncertain post-Bridge times, Sydney Ferries Limited sought a refreshed look for their ferries, covering the original livery of varnished timber and white trim with yellow and green paint and red trim. In 1937, Lady Ferguson re-entered service with a six-cylinder 65 hp Henty & Gardner diesel that pushed her to 9 knots. The five "Lady" ferries continued to run the Hunters Hill and Balmain services.

The post-Bridge drop in demand for the ferry fleet was somewhat mitigated as many could not afford their own transport in the Great Depression of the 1930s and rationing of fuel during World War 2 made the coal required for the steam ferries comparatively cheap.

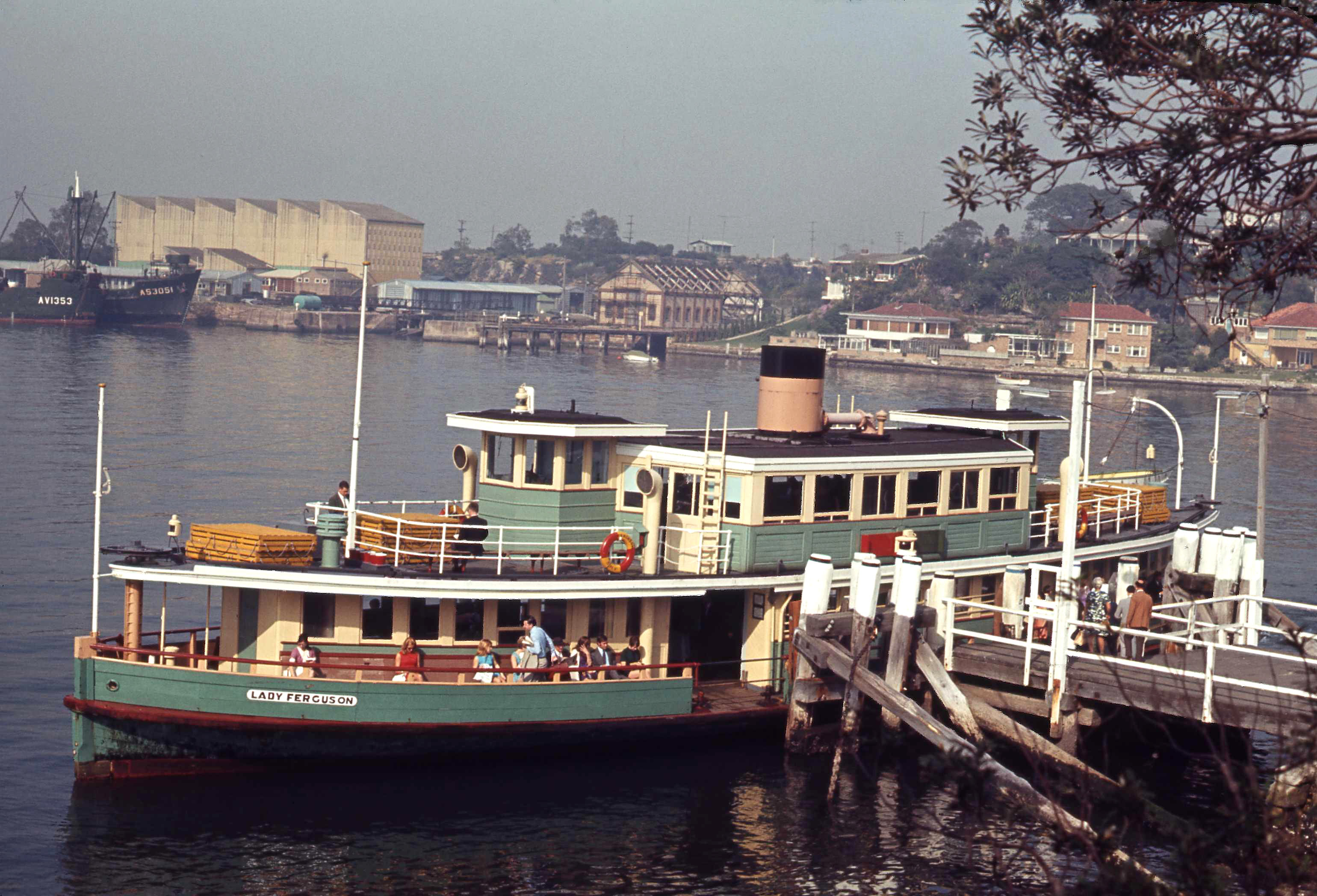
At Valentia Street Wharf (now Woolwich Wharf) as a diesel vessel, 1970

However, after World War 2, the drop in demand for ferry services increased. In 1951, annual patronage dropped to 9 million and the NSW State Government took over Sydney Ferries Limited and its remaining fleet and assets. The Port Jackson and Manly Steamship Company, which ran the Manly service, was paid to run the services. The services and fleet were quickly rationalised with most of the larger remaining timber K-class steamers being decommissioned. However, the five relatively small and economical "Lady-class" ferries were retained. Throughout the remainder of the 1950s and into the 1960s, they became the back-bone of Sydney Harbour's non-Manly ferry fleet, along with Karingal and Karrabee the smallest of the K-class ferries. Their routes were expanded to all inner-harbour (ie, non-Manly) services including Taronga Park Zoo, Milsons Point, Cremorne and Hunters Hill.

The five sister ferries (except Lady Scott) were re-engined again in the late 1950s and early 1960s. Lady Ferguson received a 4-cylinder 300 bhp Crossley Brothers diesel that pushed her to 10 knots. In the 1960s the Board updated all their ferries' 1930s green and gold livery to a more muted cream and khaki scheme.

== Demise ==
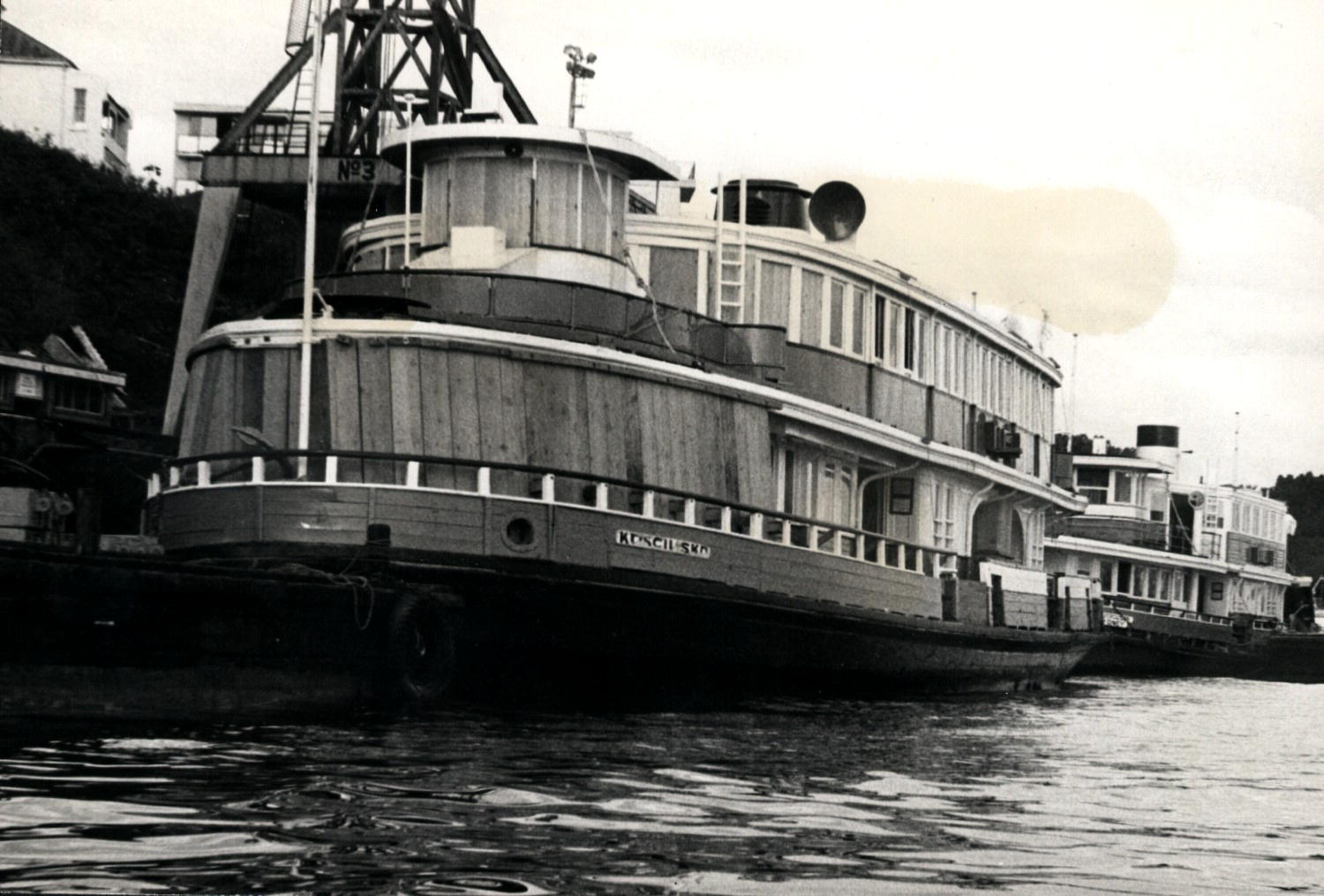
Behind Kosciusko boarded up ready for the trip to Hobart, 1975

Lady Ferguson was used as a relief vessel from 1963. In the 1970s, the fleet were painted in the Public Transport Commission's blue and white scheme, except for Lady Ferguson who was the last ferry to wear the green and cream. By the 1970s, her condition was deteriorating and she was set aside for disposal in 1974. She was towed to Hobart with Kosciusko in 1975 to assist following the collapse of the Tasman Bridge, however, upon arrival she was found to be in too poor condition to be used. She was broken up in 1977 in Hobart.

As for Lady Ferguson's four sister vessels, Lady Chelmsford, the first built of the five, was sold in 1969 and rebuilt as a show boat in Adelaide. She was sold to Melbourne interests in 1985 where she was used as a cruise boat. She sank at her moorings in 2008 and was broken up in 2011. Lady Scott was sold out of ferry service in 1969 and used as a cruise ferry. A 1972 fire destroyed her superstructure and she was rebuilt as the John Cadman and undertook a successful career as a cruise boat before being sold in 2000s and falling into disrepair and broken up in 2014. Lady Denman was pulled from ferry service in 1979 following the introduction that year of the new Lady Street. She is now on permanent land display at Huskisson on the New South Wales south coast. Lady Edeline was the longest serving as a Sydney ferry being decommissioned in 1984 with the remaining wooden K-class ferries following the Karrabee's sinking earlier that year. She was laid up on the Parramatta River and sank into the mud in 1988. Of the original five, only Lady Denman is extant.

== See also ==
- List of Sydney Harbour ferries
