= Kaikai =

Kaikai is a surname, and may refer to:

- Ansumana Jaia Kaikai, Sierra Leonean politician
- Linus Kaikai, Kenyan journalist
- Moijueh Kaikai, Sierra Leonean politician
- Septimus Kaikai, Sierra Leonean politician and broadcaster
- Sullay Kaikai (born 1995), English association footballer

Kaikai may also refer to:

- Kaikai (ferry), a former ferry on Sydney Harbour
- Kaikai Kiki, an art production and artist management company
- KiKi KaiKai, a shoot 'em up video game

== Drinks ==
- Ogogoro, a West African alcoholic drink, also known as kaikai
