= David Drake Limited =

David Drake Limited was a major Australian shipbuilding company. It had facilities located at Bald Rock, Balmain, Johnson's Bay, Pyrmont and Drummoyne in New South Wales. David Drake began ship building in 1866, the ship building business was later incorporated. David died in 1922, and the shipbuilding business continued until 1934.

== Ships ==
- Annie D. (1866)
- Evelyn (1867)
- Albatross
- Dunskey
- Brooklyn S.
- Bunya-Bunya
- Waratah
- SS Benelon
- Gratitude
- Terranora
- Malekula
- Mokau
- Nugarea
- Jubilee
- Kamilaroi
- Grazier
- Lady Ferguson
- SS Greycliffe (1910)
- SS Kuramia (1913)
- SS Cobaki (1918)
- SS Narrabeen (1921)
- Kai Kai
- Killara
- Kangaroo
- Barangaroo
- Bald Rock
- Koree
- Repton
- Kosciusko
- Kedumba
- Wauchope
- Lone Pine
- Nanagai
