= Kosciusko (ferry) =

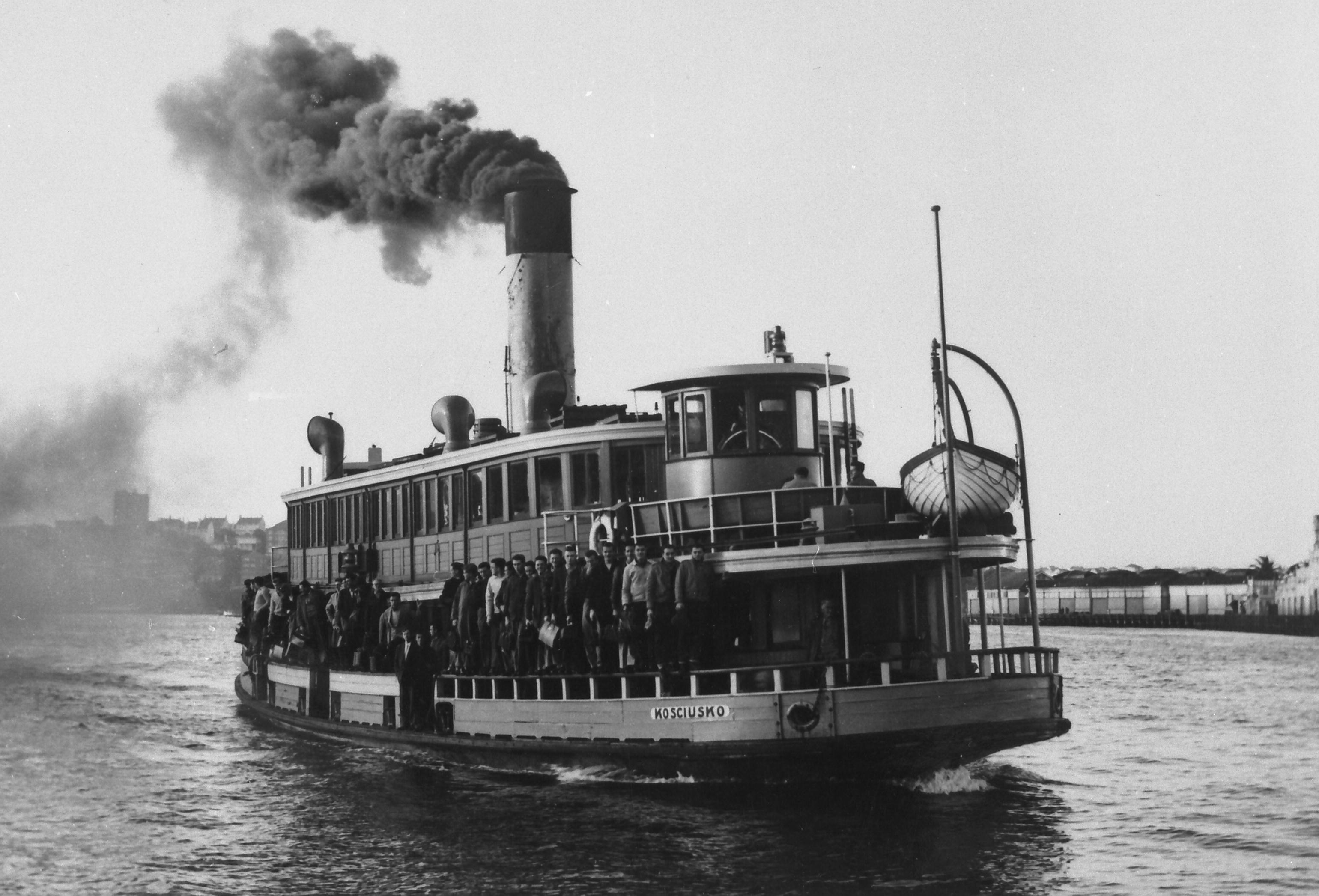
- Kosciusko as a steamer approaches Circular Quay

History
- Name: Kosciusko
- Operator: Sydney Ferries Limited; Sydney Harbour Transport Board; Public Transport Commission
- Builder: David Drake
- Cost: £12,617.
- Launched: 1911
- Out of service: 1975
- Fate: Burnt out 1986 in Hobart

General characteristics
- Tonnage: 165
- Length: 34.1m
- Speed: 10 knots (Kosciusko)
- Capacity: 790 passengers approx.

Kosciusko was a "K-class" ferry on Sydney Harbour. Launched in 1911, the timber-hulled steamer was built for Sydney Ferries Limited during the boom in cross-harbour ferry travel prior to the opening of the Sydney Harbour Bridge.

Kosciusko was converted to diesel propulsion in the 1950s and served on Sydney Harbour until 1975 when she was sent to Hobart to assist following the collapse of the Tasman bridge. She was burnt out in 1982.

== Background ==
Intended for the Mosman run, Kosciusko was built for Sydney Ferries Limited during the early twentieth century boom in cross-Harbour travel prior to the 1932 opening of the Sydney Harbour Bridge. At the time, the company ran one of the largest ferry fleets in the world. The ferry was part of broader type of around 20 double-ended timber screw ferries the Sydney K-class ferries that the company commissioned between the 1890s and early 1920s to meet the booming demand.

While Kosciusko followed the Sydney Ferries Limited tradition of naming their vessels starting with K, unlike the rest of the fleet, her name was not an Australian Aboriginal word. Rather, Kosciusko was named after the Australian mountain which was, in turn, named after Polish military leader Tadeusz Kościuszko.

== Design and construction ==
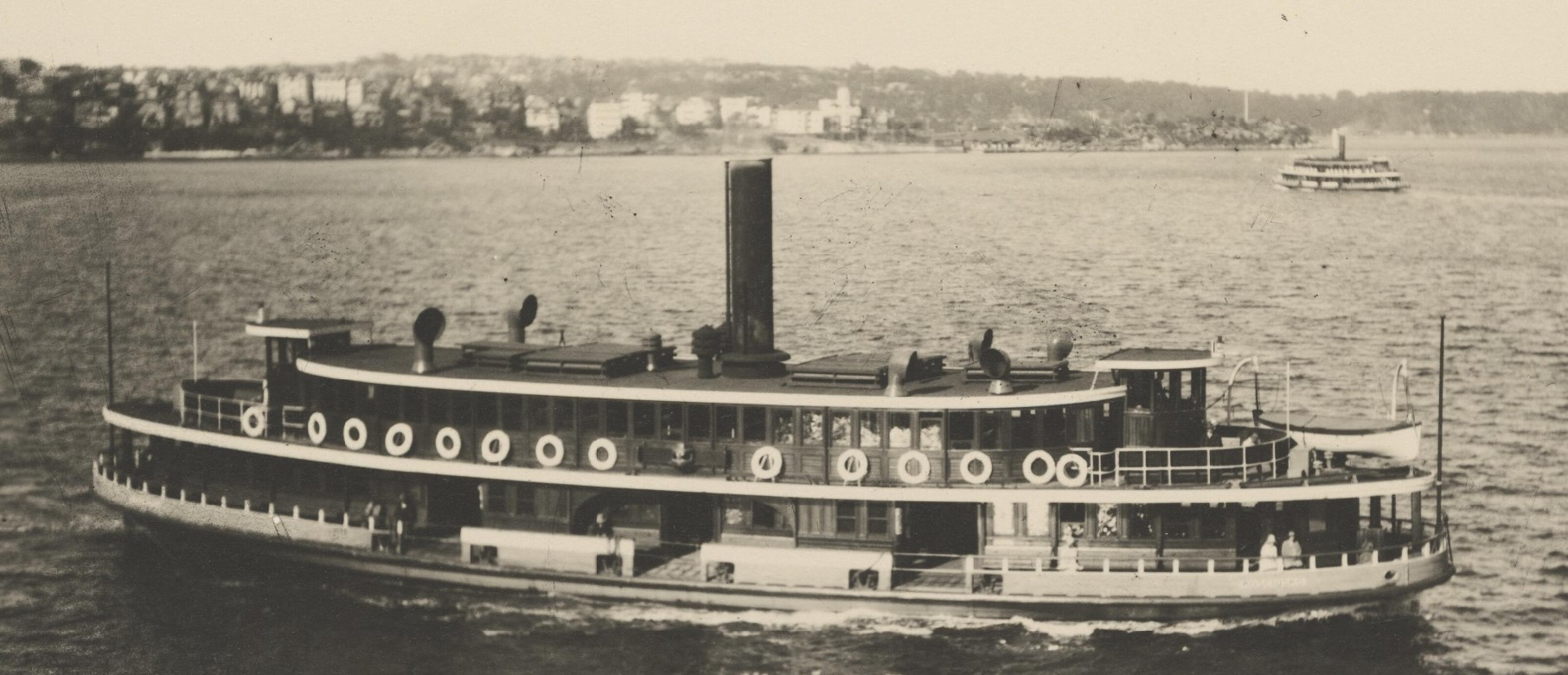
Kosciusko as built as a steamer and in her original varnished timber, white trim, and black funnel livery, 1920s.

Kosciusko was built in 1911 by David Drake, of Balmain for £12,617. Her 54 hp triple expansion steam engine was supplied by Campbell & Calderwell and pushed her to 10 knots. Also a timber-built vessel, she was 165 tons, 35.4 m and had a passenger capacity of 785. Although built by different builders, she was very similar in form and size to Kanimbla, such that the two were often considered sister ships.

== Service history ==
Kosciusko was one of the few formerly numerous K-class ferries to survive both the 1932 opening of the Sydney Harbour Bridge and the 1950s state government rationalisation of the fleet. Kanangra, Karingal, Karrabee, and Kameruka were also kept in service and converted from steam to diesel propulsion in the 1930s and 1950s. Kosciusko was converted to diesel in 1959 (60 hp Crossley, 11 knots) which allowed coal-fired Kareela to be retired. When first commissioned, Kosciusko was a medium size ferry in comparison to the rest of the Sydney Ferries fleet, however, by the 1970s, she was the second largest.

In 1975, Hobart's north–south link was cut by the Tasman Bridge disaster. Alternatives were urgently needed, and Sydney's then new Lady Wakehurst was sent to the Tasmanian city to assist with cross-Derwent travel. Lady Ferguson and Kosciusko were towed to Hobart soon after, however, the timber 1914-built Lady Ferguson was in too poor condition to be used. Kosciusko was sold to the city and following re-opening of the bridge, she was again sold and used as a floating restaurant. During renovations in 1982, she caught fire and was burnt out. Her stern, including the propeller and rudder, are displayed outside a hotel in Hobart.

== Incidents ==
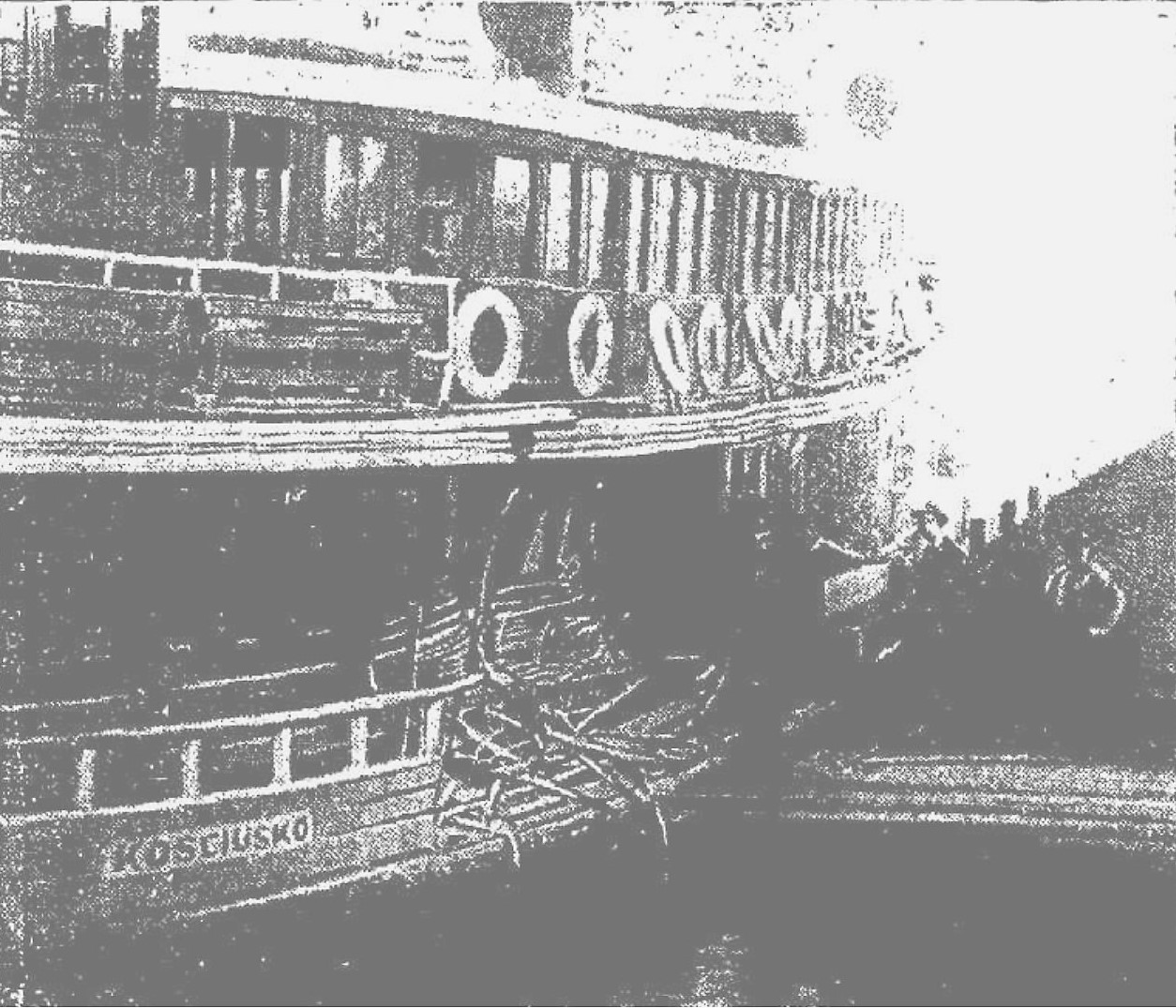
Kosciusko, after collision with Kulgoa, 10 June 1921

- Early in her service life, Kosciusko was rammed by a steel fuel barge under tow, causing her severe damage. She did not sink because the barge could not be easily removed and sealed the hole in her hull.
- 10 June 1921 - On a foggy morning, Kosciusko collided with Kulgoa. Both ferries were on their way to Circular Quay, with Kulgoa in-bound from Milsons Point, and Kosciusko from Neutral Bay. Kosciusko had part of bulwarks and men's smoking cabin smashed, whereas damage to Kulgoa was limited to the davit crane and locking gear of the rudder.
- September 1924, Kosciusko collided with Kurraba in Neutral Bay. Kurraba was significantly damaged with bulwarks ripped away and her cabin bulwark smashed. Damage to Kosciusko was light in comparison. Both ferries were carrying large numbers of passengers, but there were no injuries.
- December 1926, Kosciusko collided with Manly ferry Baragoola off Bennelong Point.
- 28 July 1933, Kosciusko ran aground at Kirribilli Point near Admiralty House while travelling to Neutral Bay in thick winter fog. The stock and pintle of the rudder were broken, disabling steering at one end of the ferry.
- August 1937, Kosciusko collided head on with ferry Kiamala causing significant damage to both vessels.

== Timeline ==
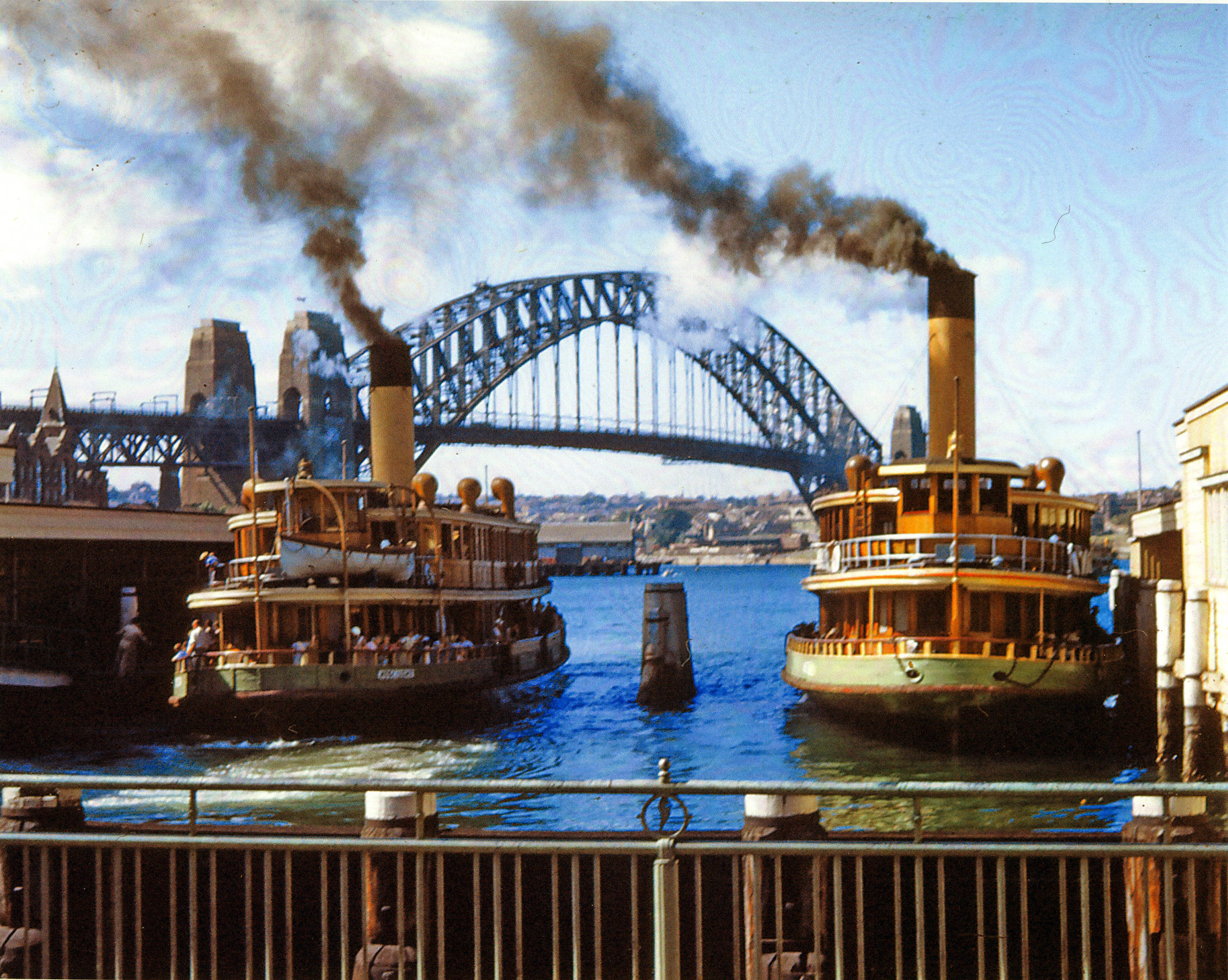
Kosciusko (left) as a steamer alongside Kubu (right) at Circular Quay in their post mid 1930s yellow and green livery, 1956

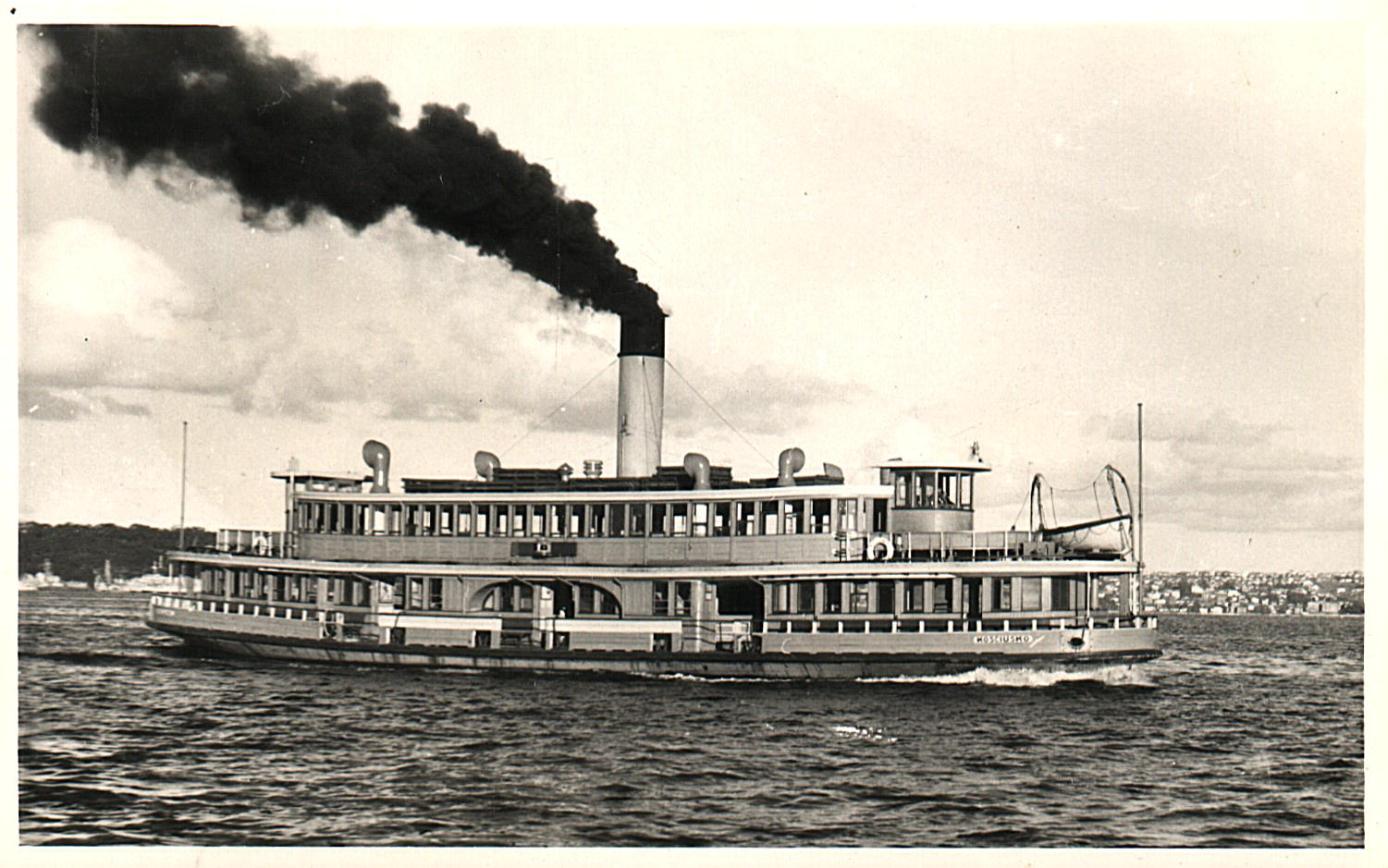
Kosciusko on the Taronga Zoo run 1955

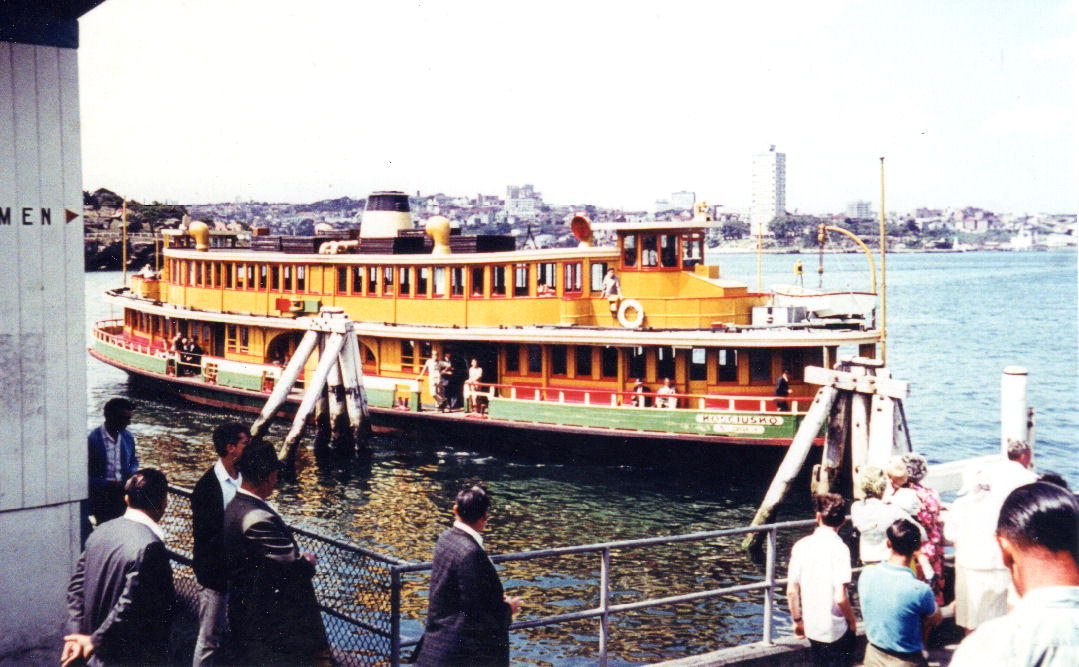
Approaching Darling Street Wharf (East Balmain Wharf) in the 1960s following her conversion to diesel

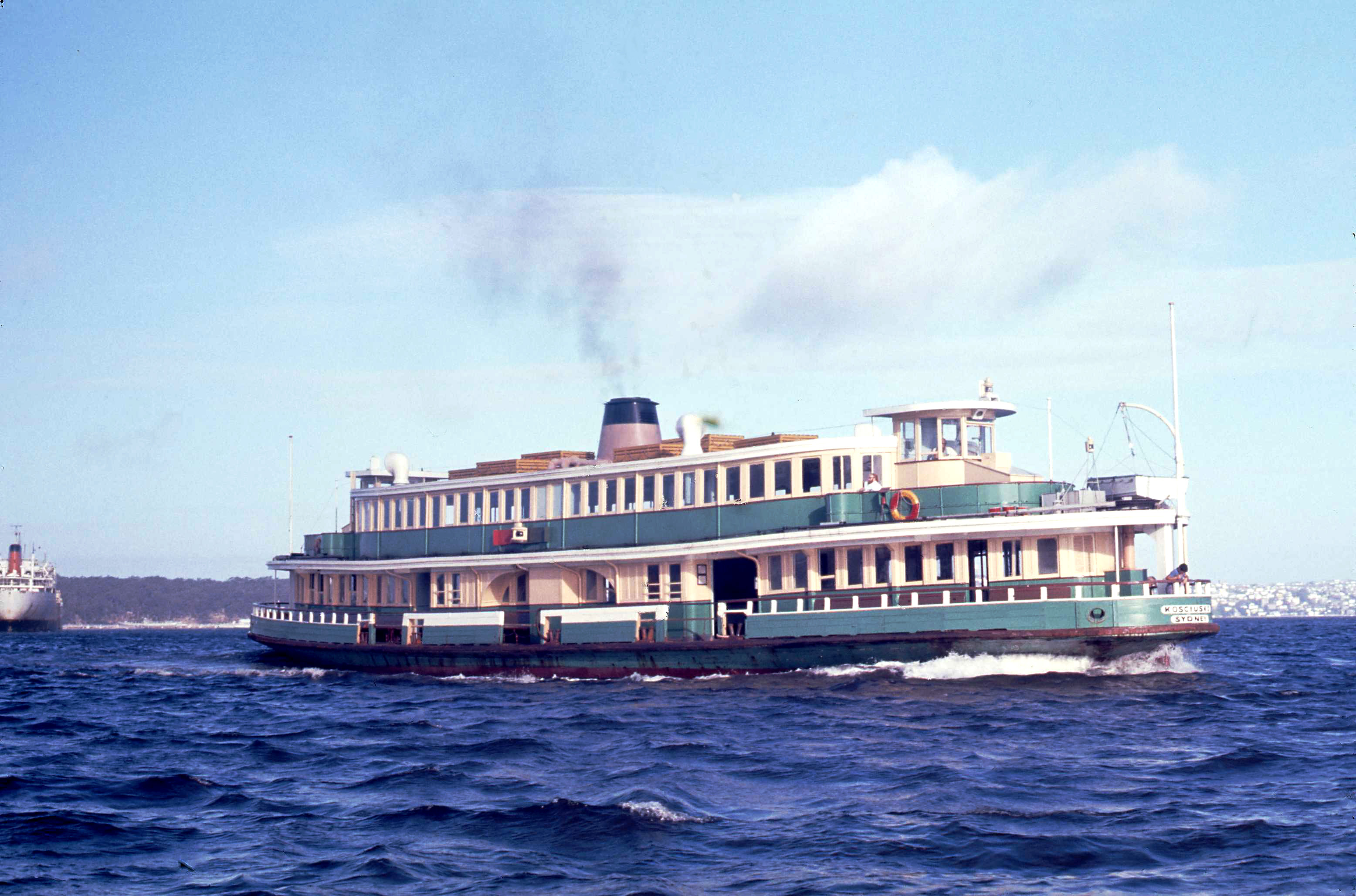
Kosciusko off Cremorne Point as a diesel vessel, 1973

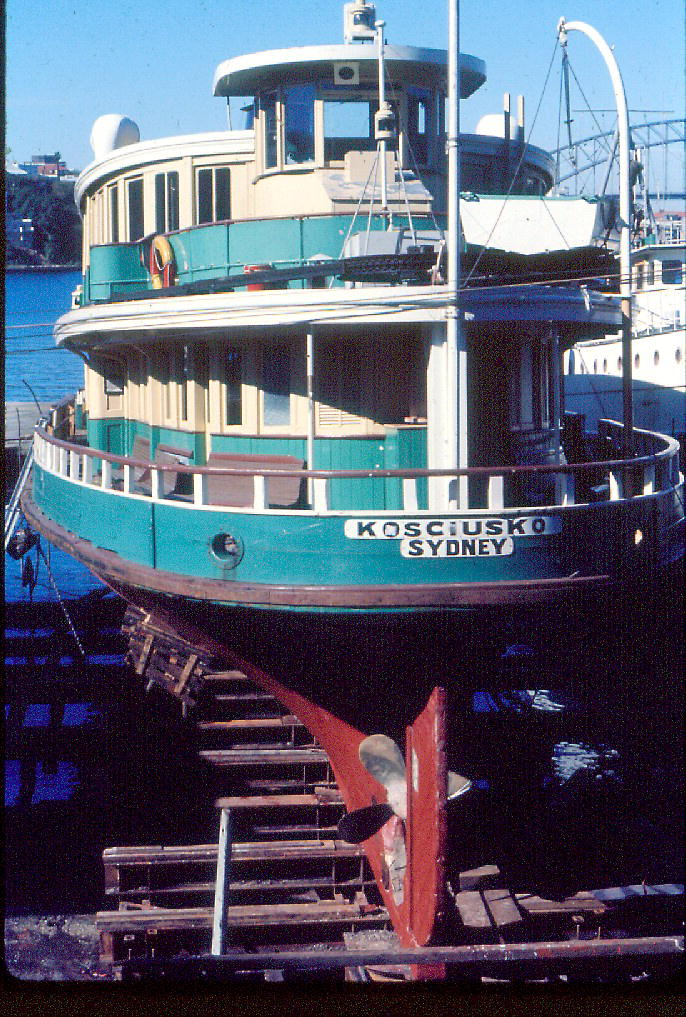
Kosciusko on Woodleys slip for maintenance, August 1973

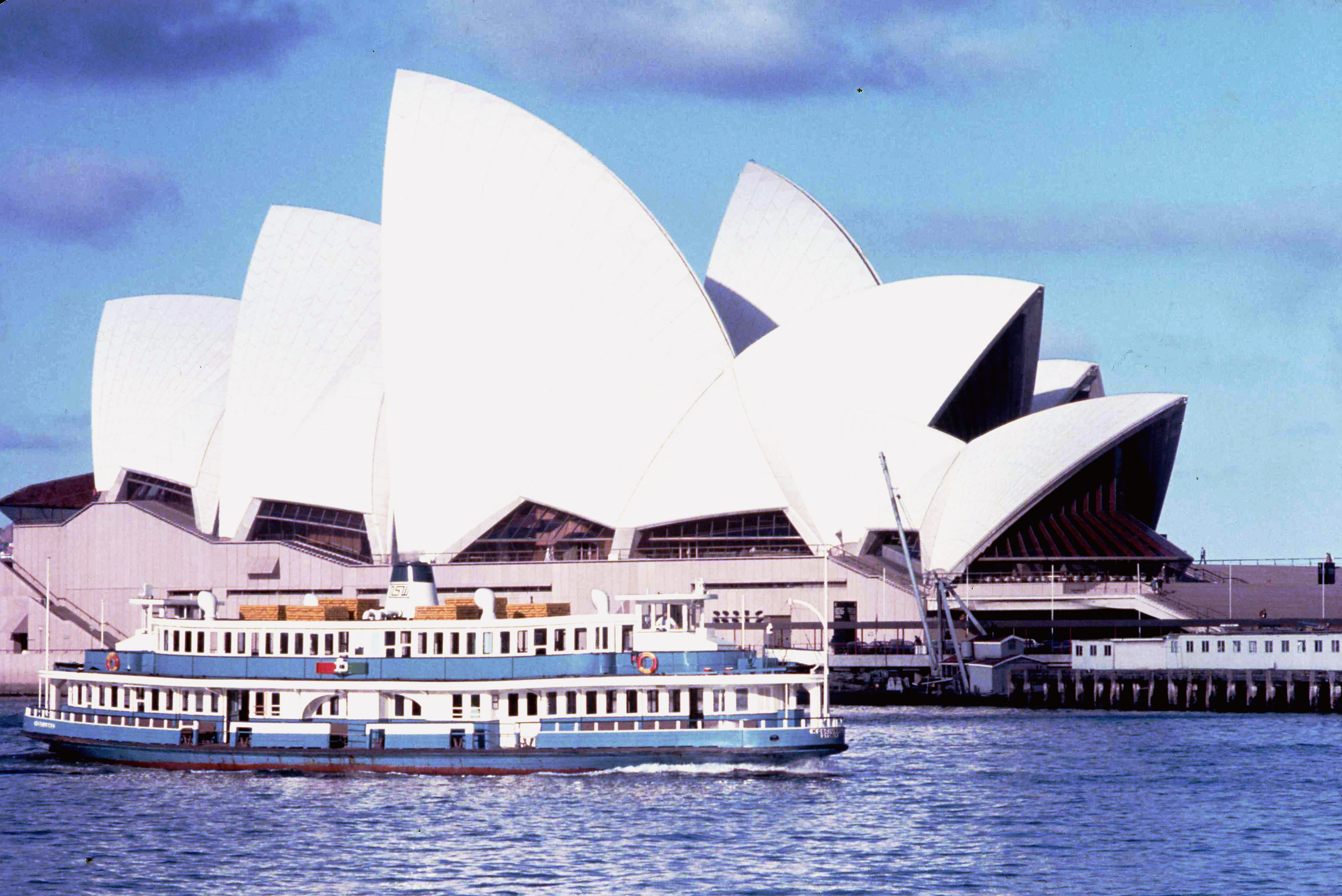
Kosciusko passing the newly opened Sydney Opera House in Public Transport Commission colours, 25 October 1973

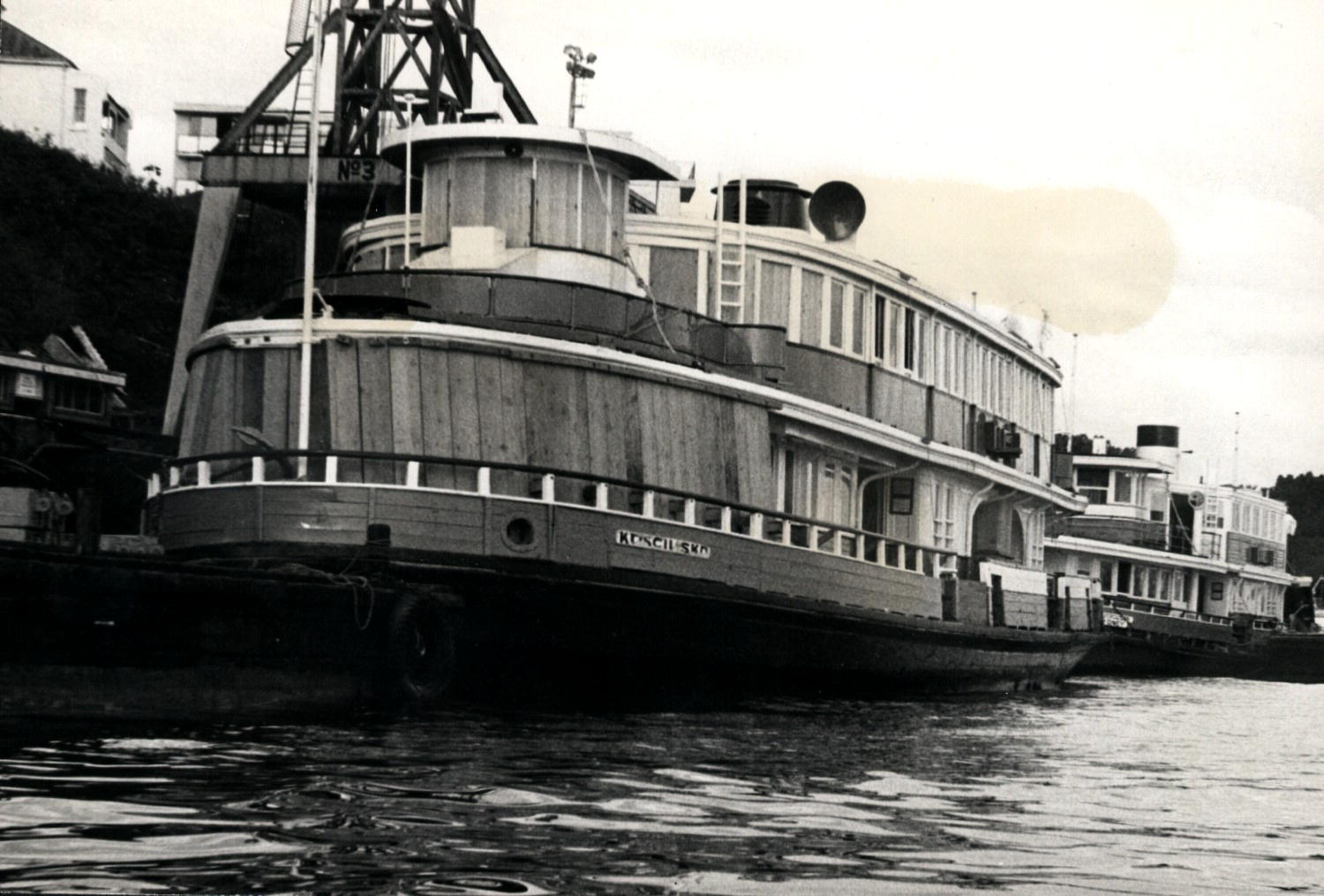
Kosciusko boarded up ready for the tow to Hobart following the collapse of the Tasman Bridge, 1975

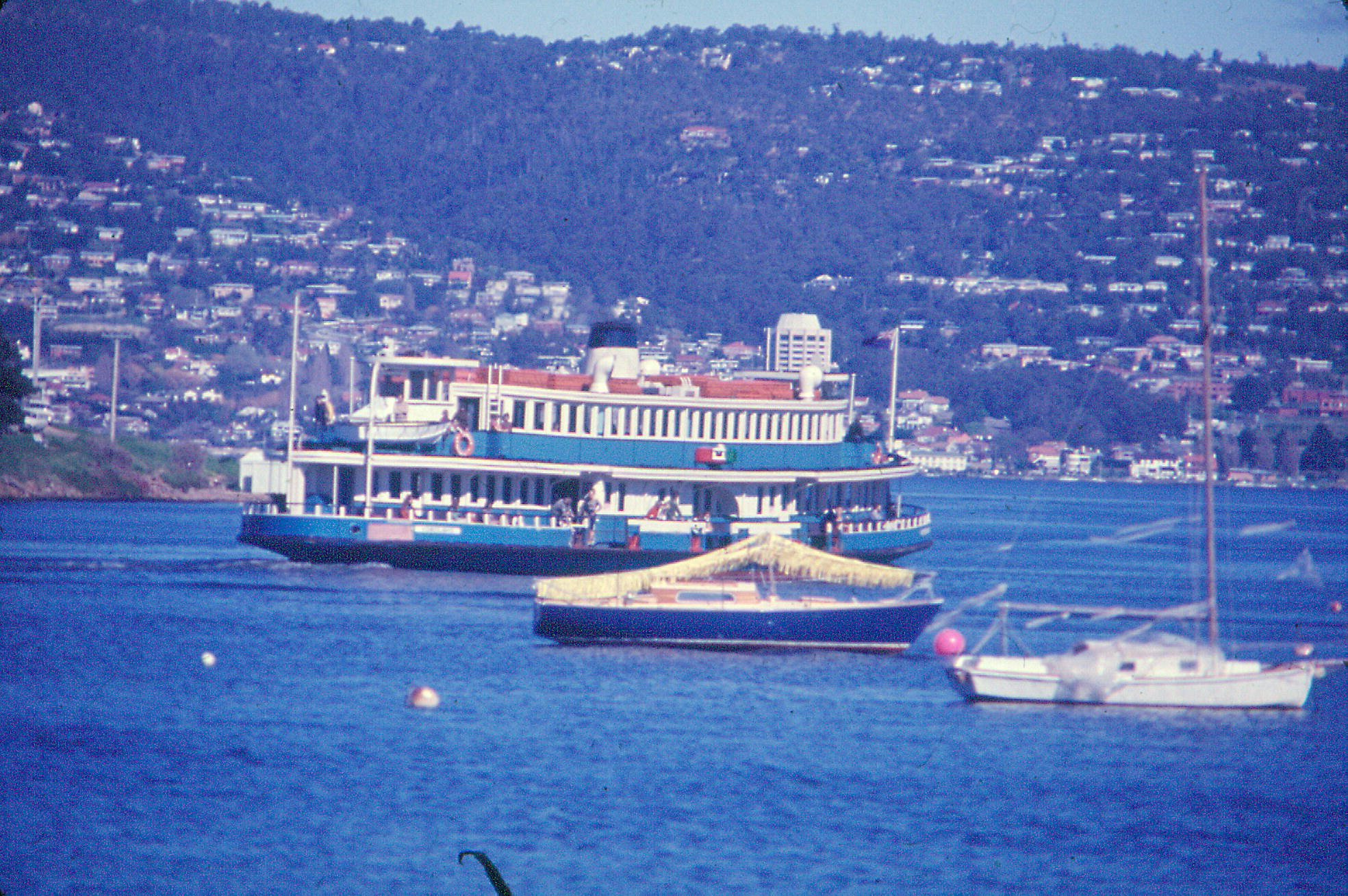
Kosciusko in Hobart to assist following the collapse of the Tasman Bridge

== See also ==
- List of Sydney Harbour ferries
- Timeline of Sydney Harbour ferries
- Sydney K-class ferries
