= Strahan =

Strahan may refer to:

- Strahan (surname)
- Strahan, Tasmania, main port town of Macquarie Harbour, Western Tasmania
- HMAS Strahan, Bathurst class corvette serving during World War II
