= Strachan =

Strachan is a surname of Scottish origin (see Clan Strachan, Strachan Baronets), which is pronounced /ˈstræxən/ or /strɔːn/. Notable people with the surname include:

- Allerdyce Strachan, Bahamian police officer
- Andy Strachan (born 1974), drummer
- Ant Strachan (born 1966), New Zealand rugby union player
- Anthonique Strachan (born 1993), Bahamian runner
- Archibald Strachan (died 1652), Scottish soldier
- Billy Strachan (1921–1998), British anti-colonial activist
- Dina Strachan (fl. 2000s), American academic dermatologist
- Douglas Strachan (1875–1950), Scottish designer of stained glass windows
- Gavin Strachan (born 1978), Scottish footballer
- Geoffrey Strachan, translator of French and German into English
- Gilbert Strachan (1888–1963), Professor of medicine
- Grace Strachan (1863–1922), American educator, labor leader
- Graeme Strachan (1952–2001), Australian singer and television personality, known as "Shirley" Strachan
- Gordon Strachan (born 1957), Scottish footballer and manager
- Gordon Strachan (minister) (1934–2010), Church of Scotland minister, theologian, university lecturer and author
- Gordon C. Strachan (born 1943), aide to H. R. Haldeman
- Harcus Strachan (1884–1982), Scottish-born Canadian recipient of the Victoria Cross
- Hew Strachan (born 1949), military historian
- Hugh Strachan (1939–2023), Scottish footballer
- Ian Strachan MBE AFC (1938-), Chief Test Pilot at Farnborough and holder of the FAI Lilienthal Medal
- Jamahl Strachan (born 1988), Bahamian politician
- James Strachan (ice hockey) (1876–1939), Canadian ice hockey executive
- James Strachan (programmer), developer of the Apache Groovy programming language
- James McGill Strachan (1808–1870), Canadian lawyer
- Sir John Strachan, 5th Baronet, British sea captain
- John Strachan (1778–1867), Anglican bishop in Canada
- John Strachan (linguist) (1862–1907), scholar of Celtic languages
- John Strachan (singer) (1875–1958), Scottish farmer and traditional ballads singer
- Joshua Strachan (born 1976), musician, record producer
- Keith Strachan (born 1944, composer, theatre director
- Linda Strachan (born 1961), Scottish author
- Matthew Strachan (1970–2021), songwriter
- Merrill Strachan, Canadian politician
- Mike Strachan (disambiguation), multiple people
- Michaela Strachan (born 1966), British TV presenter
- Sir Richard Strachan, 6th Baronet (1760–1828), British admiral
- Steve Strachan (sheriff) (born 1965), American law enforcement officer and politician
- Winnifred Strachan (1930–2007), Grenadian politician
- Zoë Strachan (born 1975), Scottish novelist

== See also ==
- Strachan, Aberdeenshire
- Strachan Open, 1992–1994 professional snooker tournament, sponsored by billiard cloth company Strachan
- Strahan (surname)
