= Allerdyce =

Allerdyce is a name that may refer to:

- Allerdyce Strachan, Bahamian law enforcement officer
- John Allerdyce, known as "Pyro" in Marvel Comics' X-Men
- Jebidiah Allerdyce "Cookie" Farnsworth, a role played by Jim Varney in Atlantis: The Lost Empire
