= Kabbarli =

History
- Builder: State Dockyard
- Yard number: 28
- Launched: 3 June 1950
- Completed: 23 November 1951
- Maiden voyage: January 1952
- Identification: Official number: 140224
- Fate: Sank

General characteristics
- Tonnage: 2,693 GRT, 1,990 DWT
- Propulsion: 2 x British Polar Engines M45Ms
- Speed: 11 knots
- Capacity: 37 passengers

Kabbarli was a passenger ship operated by Stateships in Western Australia. Built by the State Dockyard, Newcastle it sank in Cambodia after being hit by a rocket.

== History ==
Kabbarli was ordered by the Australian Shipping Board from the State Dockyard, Newcastle as a cargo passenger ship the intended it be put into service between East Coast of Australia and Pacific Islands. While under construction it was sold to Stateships, Western Australia. It was launched as the Dongata later being renamed Kabbarli.

It made it maiden voyage from Fremantle to Darwin via North West Coast ports in January 1952.

In 1962 a shelter deck was fitted in Fremantle to increase cargo capacity. It was sold in October 1971 to Asiatic Intermodal Seabridge, Panama and operated in South East Asia.

In June 1972, it struck a mine and was beached near the mouth of the Mekong River, temporary repairs performed with more permanent ones in Manila. On 21 July 1974 it was hit by a rocket and caught fire on a voyage from Singapore to Phnom Penh. It reached its destination, sinking on 3 August 1974 due to the weight of the fire fighting water onboard.
