= HMAS Condamine =

1944 River-class frigate

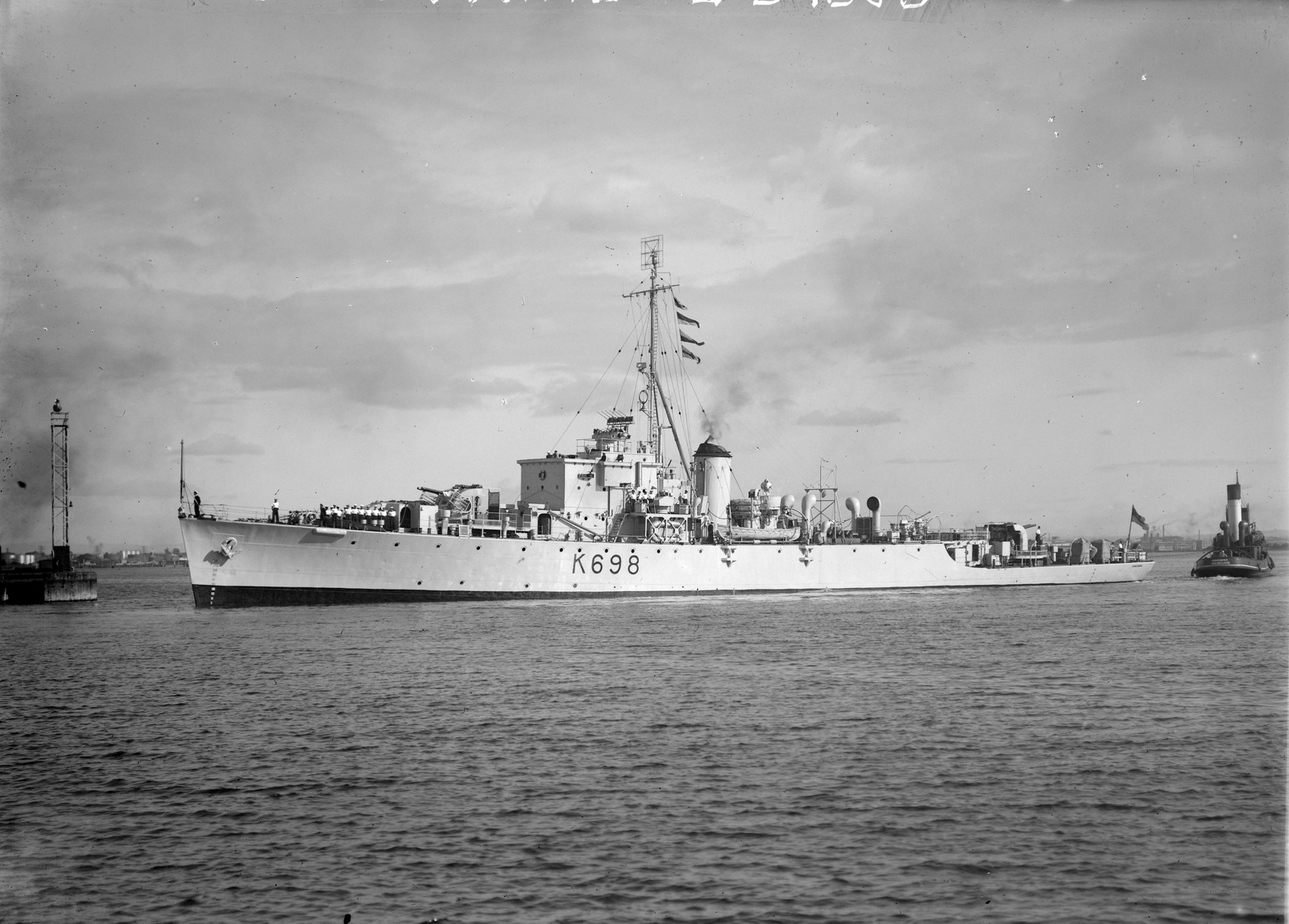
- HMAS Condamine in 1949

History

Australia
- Name: Condamine
- Namesake: Condamine River
- Builder: State Dockyard, Newcastle
- Laid down: 30 October 1943
- Launched: 4 November 1944
- Commissioned: 22 February 1946
- Decommissioned: 2 December 1955
- Motto: "We fight for peace"
- Honours and awards: Battle honours: Korea 1952–53
- Fate: Scrapped
- Badge

General characteristics
- Class & type: River-class frigate
- Displacement: 1,537 tons (standard)
- Length: 301 ft 7 in (91.92 m)
- Beam: 36 ft 6 in (11.13 m)
- Draught: 12 ft (3.7 m)
- Propulsion: Triple expansion, 2 shafts
- Speed: 19.5 knots (36.1 km/h; 22.4 mph)
- Complement: 175
- Armament: 4 × 4-inch guns; 3 × 40 mm Bofors; 4 × 20 mm Oerlikons; 1 × Hedgehog; 4 × depth charge throwers

HMAS Condamine (K698/F698), named for the Condamine River in Queensland, was a River-class frigate of the Royal Australian Navy (RAN). Commissioned in 1946, Condamine served in the Korean War. The ship was paid off in 1955, and sold for scrap in 1961.

== Construction ==
Condamine was laid down by the State Dockyard at Newcastle, New South Wales on 30 October 1943, launched on 4 November 1944 and commissioned on 22 February 1946.

== Operational history ==
During the first years of her career Condamine operated only in Australian and New Guinean waters.

From August 1952 to March 1953 the ship operated in Korean waters during the Korean War. During this deployment, she conducted a number of shore bombardments and protected United Nations forces on islands off the Korean peninsula. Condamine was awarded the battle honour "Korea 1952–53" for this deployment.

Following the end of the Korean War, Condamine completed a second tour of Korean waters between February and November 1955.

== Decommissioning and fate ==
Condamine paid off into reserve on 2 December 1955, and was sold for scrap on 21 September 1961.
