= Freshwater-class ferry =

Ferry class operating services on Sydney Harbour

Freshwater class
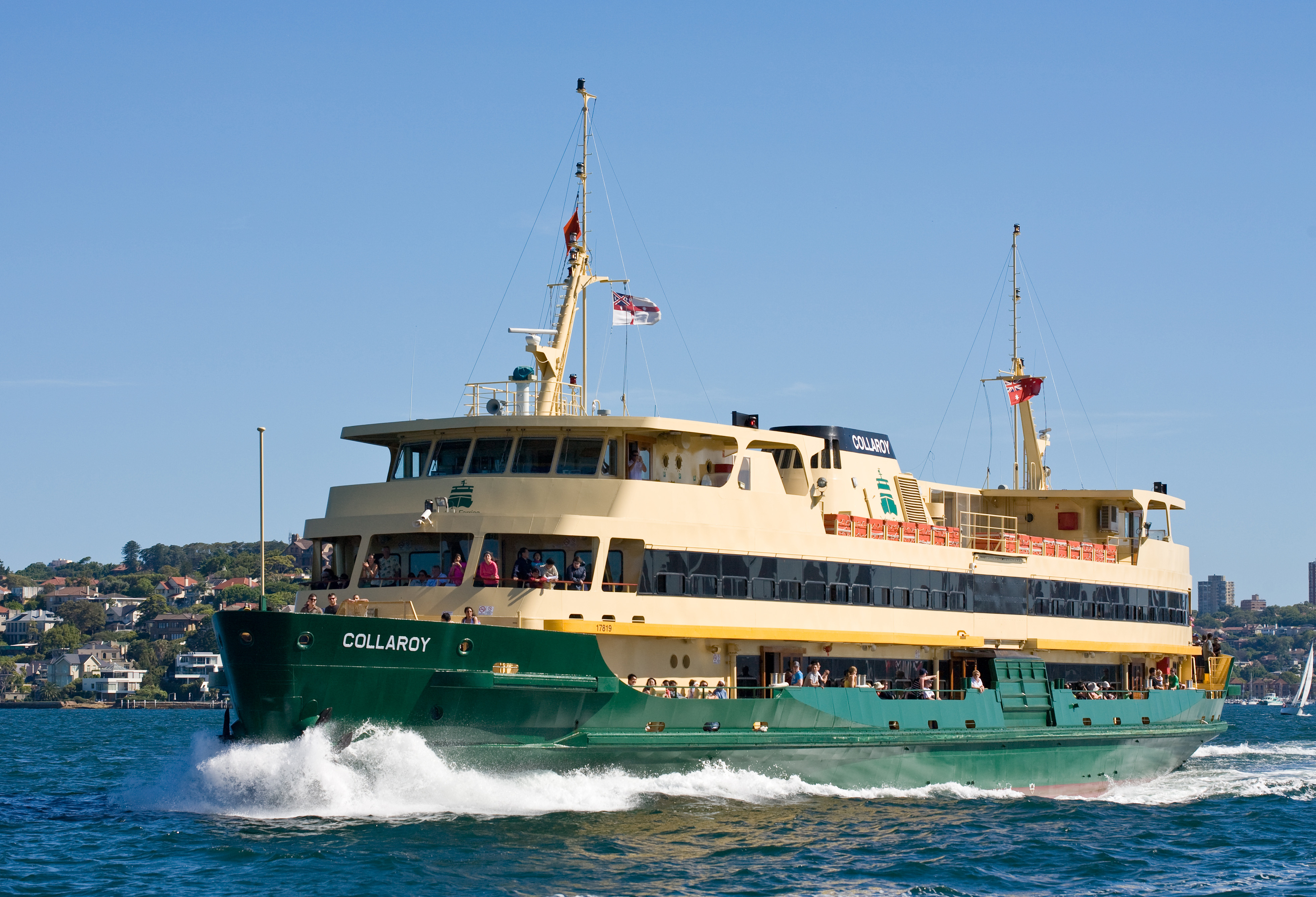
- Collaroy in 2008

Class overview
- Builders: State Dockyard Newcastle (2) and later Carrington Slipways Newcastle (2)
- Operators: Franchisee Transdev Sydney Ferries
- Preceded by: South Steyne, Dee Why class, Binngarra
- Completed: 4
- Active: 3
- Retired: 1

General characteristics
- Displacement: 1,140 tons (loaded)
- Length: 70.4 m (231 ft 0 in)
- Beam: 13.06 m (42 ft 10 in)
- Draught: 3.35 m (11 ft 0 in)
- Decks: 2
- Ramps: 4 hydraulic passenger ramps
- Propulsion: 2x feathering propellers. One on each end.
- Capacity: 1,100
- Crew: 6
- Notes: Double ended single hull of welded steel construction. Welded aluminium alloy superstructure.

The Freshwater class is a class of ferry operating the Manly ferry service between Circular Quay and Manly on Sydney Harbour. The ferries are owned by the Government of New South Wales and operated by the franchisee Transdev Sydney Ferries under the government's Sydney Ferries brand.

== History ==
The need for new ferries on the Manly–Circular Quay service was identified during the mid-1970s, during which time the service was characterised by deteriorating quality and low patronage.

The ferries were also used to travel to Port Kembla and Wollongong, Broken Bay and the Central Coast, and Newcastle during the 1990s, since they had features that would allow them to travel past the Sydney Heads and into the Tasman Sea.

=== Decline of the Manly ferries ===
Prior to 1971, the ferry services on the Manly–Circular Quay route were operated by the Port Jackson & Manly Steamship Company. In that year, the company posted a modest profit of $112,000. Patronage was approaching all-time lows, but the growth prospect for ferry services was considered strong. In November 1971, the company attracted a $1.5 million takeover bid from diversified transport company Brambles Industries. The initial bid was rejected, but a later offer of $2.1 million was accepted.

When Brambles took over, the Manly fleet consisted of four ferries: South Steyne, North Head, Bellubera and Baragoola, plus hydrofoils Manly, Fairlight and Dee Why. Almost immediately, the hydrofoils were sold to Waltons Finance and leased back. The four ferries were all ageing and expensive to maintain, and it soon became evident that Brambles intended to close the service or sell the ships to the State Government at the earliest opportunity. Fare increases and service suspensions followed. Bellubera was withdrawn from service on 14 December 1973; Baragoola was to follow early the next year. Public outrage and fears that the service would be suspended entirely led to the government resuming responsibility for the operation of the ferries in February 1974.

Concerns about the ongoing serviceability of the existing vessels led to a decision to modify the design of the Lady Wakehurst and Lady Northcott, then under construction for use on the inner harbour routes, so that they could be used as relief boats on the Manly run. On 27 August 1974 the public timetable was reduced to require only two ships. The decision to modify the two Lady-class vessels proved fortuitous; as both North Head and Baragoola had to be sent for major overhauls, and the smaller ferries acted as relief ships while these works were carried out.

During the naming ceremony for Lady Northcott on 11 February 1975, then-Liberal Minister for Transport Wal Fife announced that two new ferries would be introduced to the Manly service within three years.

=== The Burness Corlett report ===
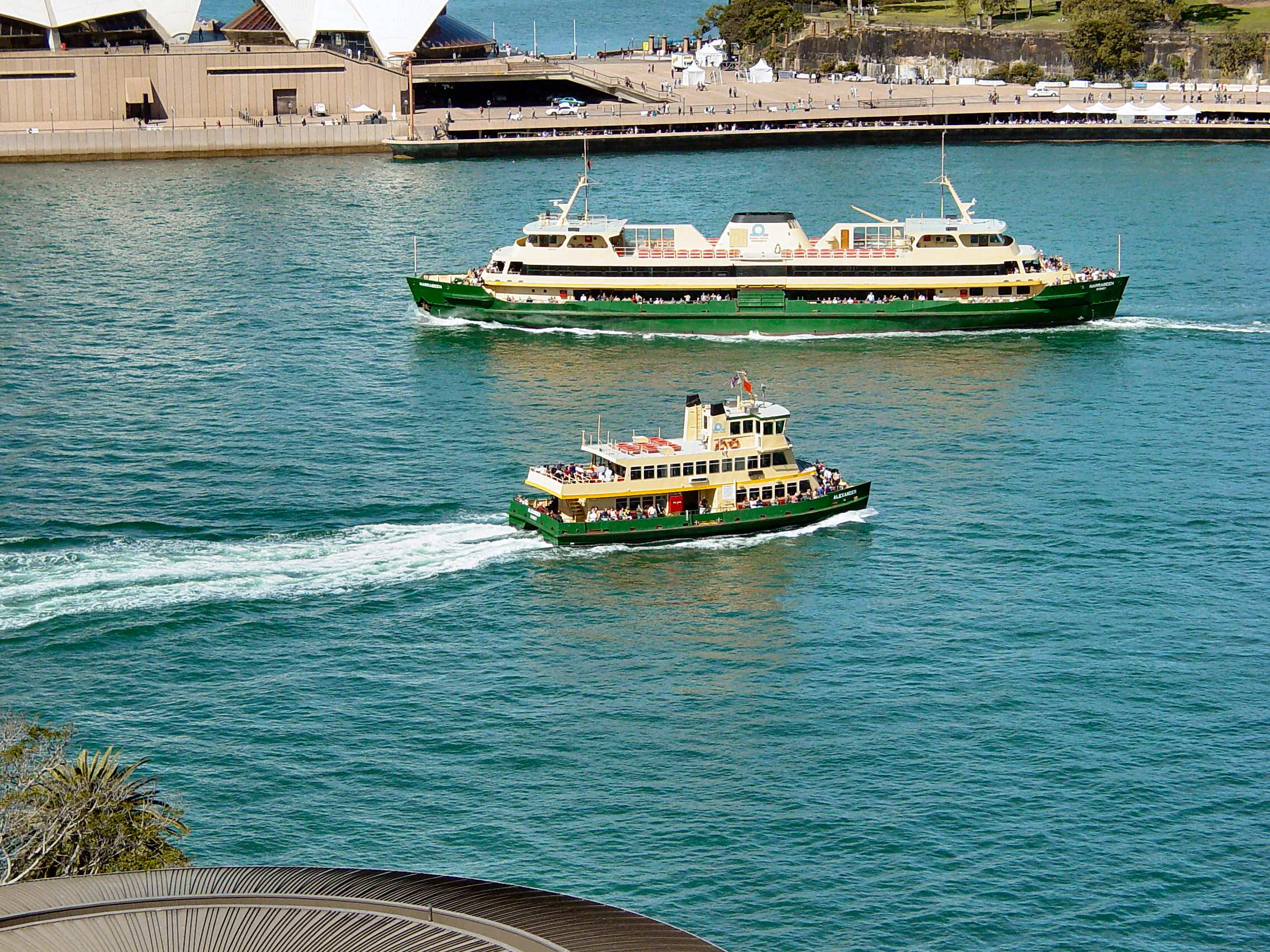
First Fleet-class ferry Alexander passes Freshwater-class ferry Narrabeen. The Freshwater class are the largest ferries in the Sydney Ferries fleet.

A study by maritime consultants Burness Corlett Australia was released in July 1976. It investigated the requirements of new vessels to replace North Head and Baragoola by 1978. Various configurations were considered, including conventional monohull, catamaran, hovercraft and hydrofoil. Planing ferries of both single and twin-hull configuration were rejected, as such a configuration cannot be double-ended and therefore would have required berthing stern-first. Hydrofoils were also rejected from consideration due to excessive cost and limited passenger capacity. Two options were selected for detailed investigation: monohull and twin-hull, both double-ended and having 1,200 passenger capacity.

Detailed designs and blueprints were prepared for both options. The study recommended the selection of the twin-hull due to the higher service frequency achievable (due to the twin-hull's faster speed of 18 knots, 33 km/h, 21 mph versus 14.5 knots, 26.9 km/h, 16.7 mph), however the study noted that other than this, there was relatively little difference between the options. The twin-hull was designed with dimensions of 63-metre (206 ft 8 in) length, 12.8-metre (42 ft 0 in) beam, and 3.3-metre (10 ft 10 in) draft, while the monohull design was 67-metre (219 ft 10 in) length, 11.6-metre (38 ft 1 in) beam, and 4.27-metre (14 ft 0 in) draft. The wider beam of the twin-hull design would exceed the limits of the existing wharves at Circular Quay, and necessitate a reconfiguration of the wharves if selected. Burness Corlett were confident that the twin-hull option was the superior choice, due to service speed and stability through Sydney Heads, and so no model tests were performed for the monohull design.

Burness Corlett predicted that either design would take approximately 21 months to construct, and that if the new ferries were to be introduced in 1978 as planned, an aggressive construction program would have to begin immediately, with tenders to be called no later than April 1976 (the report was not even released until three months after this date).

=== New ferries announced ===
After a change of government at the 1976 election, the new Labor government's Transport Minister Peter Cox announced that tenders would be called for the construction of a new "super ferry" in line with the results of the engineering study, to carry up to 1,200 passengers at speeds of 18 knots.

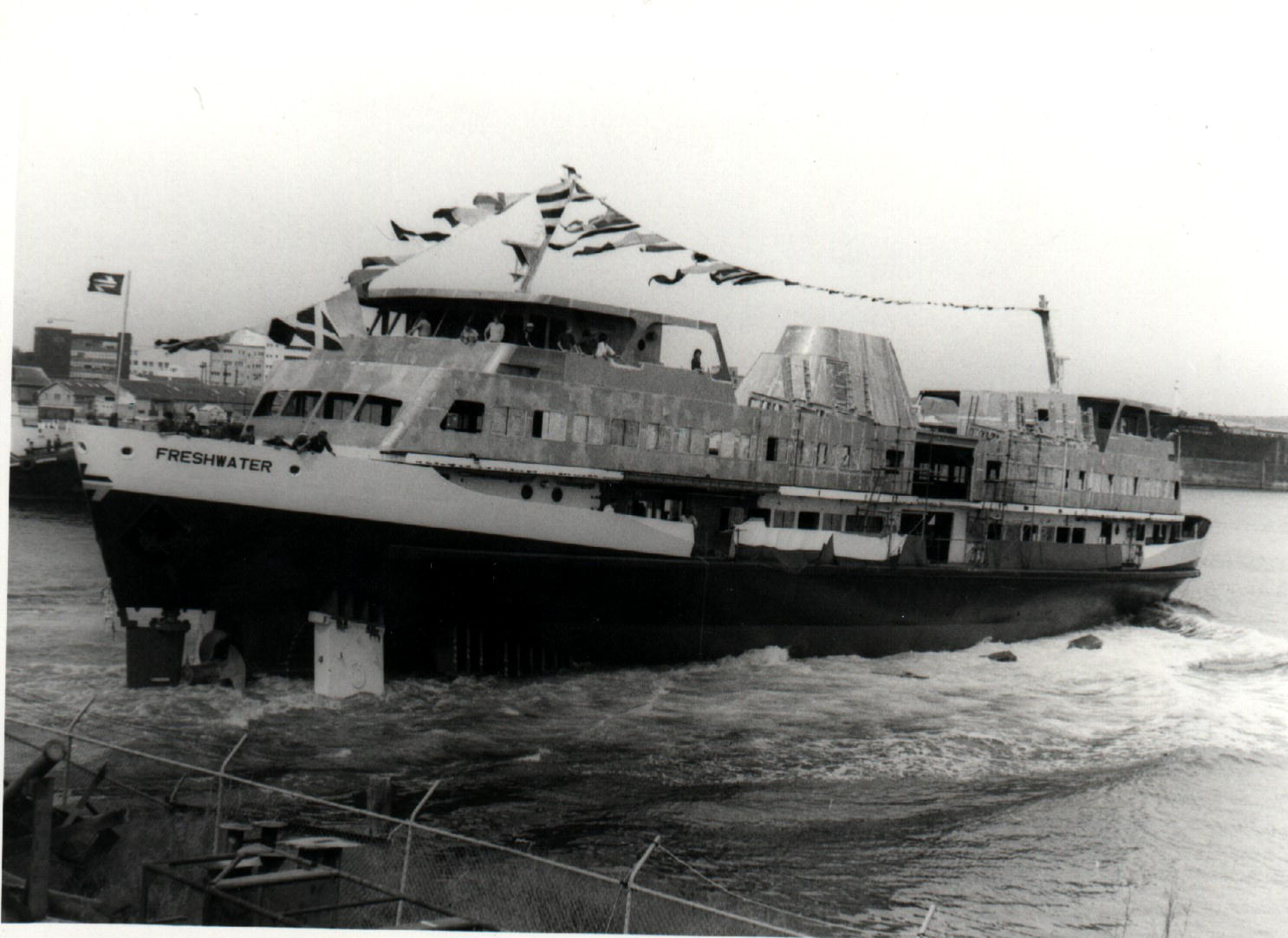
Freshwater being launched in 1982

On 9 January 1978, the traditional three-ship Manly Ferry timetable was reintroduced. The service was operated with Baragoola (1922), North Head (1913) and either Lady Wakehurst or Lady Northcott. However, the modified Lady-class ships were not good substitutes for the two older vessels, as the newer Lady ferries were too small and too slow for the Manly service. Particularly, the Lady-class ships were barely able to keep to the published timetable in peak hours. Following the return of the Labor government at the state election on 7 October 1978, the Labor Party's Alan Stewart became the member for Manly. This provided a fresh political impetus for the state Labor administration to order the new Manly ferries.

Steelwork for Freshwater was laid down at the State Dockyard on 31 October 1980. Strike actions delayed completion until June 1982. The ferry terminals at Circular Quay and Manly were substantially modified to accommodate the larger ferries, including the installation of wide height-adjustable two-level hydraulic ramps. Additionally a new bus-interchange was built in the wharf forecourt at Manly.

=== Proposed retirement 2021–2023 ===
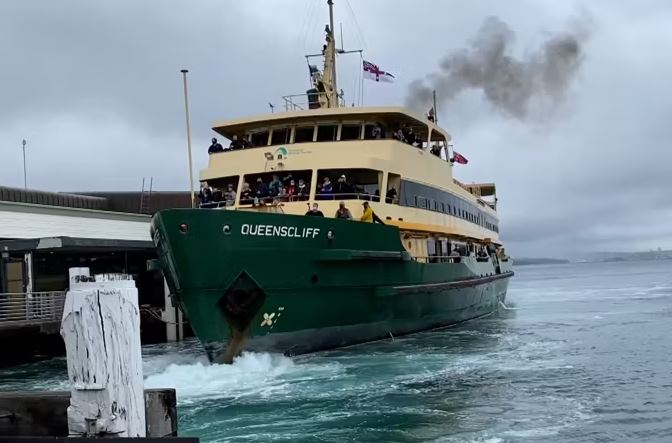
Queenscliff's final trip to Manly before her previously planned retirement. However, the ship has since been given a major overhaul and returned to service.

There were plans to replace the Freshwater-class ferries with three new Emerald-class catamaran ferries in 2021. In November 2020, transport minister Andrew Constance announced that, when the new ferries were put into operation, Collaroy would be retained in service until at least 2023 for weekend operation. On 14 January 2021 it was announced that Freshwater would also be retained for future services. Queenscliff was retired on 13 October 2021, not long after the new Emerald-class vessels began operating. Queenscliff had been in service for 38 years, just over half the time that the previous Binngarra-class vessels had operated (63 years). On 10 December 2021, it was announced that Narrabeen would get an engine rebuild. She had been in storage since June of that year as her engine hours had expired and the engines needed a major overhaul. As of January 2022, the old engines had been dismantled as part of commencing work on the overhaul. On 13 June 2022 it was announced that Collaroy would be retired and replaced with Queenscliff instead. Along with this it was also announced that Narrabeen's engine rebuild had been cancelled.

On 27 September 2023, Collaroy was retired and next day was moved to Cockatoo Island. Her last arrival into Circular Quay involved a ceremonious horn battle between Collaroy and the other vessels before she dropped off her final load and returned to Balmain. The following day she was moved to Cockatoo Island, alongside Narrabeen, for long-term storage.

=== Return to service (2023–2025) ===
After the 2023 New South Wales state election it was announced by transport minister Jo Haylen that the state government intended to return as many as possible of the four Freshwater-class ferries to full time service.

Freshwater had had a major drydocking and refit in February–March 2021, allowing the vessel to continue in service for another five years before another large refit is required (due before 2026).

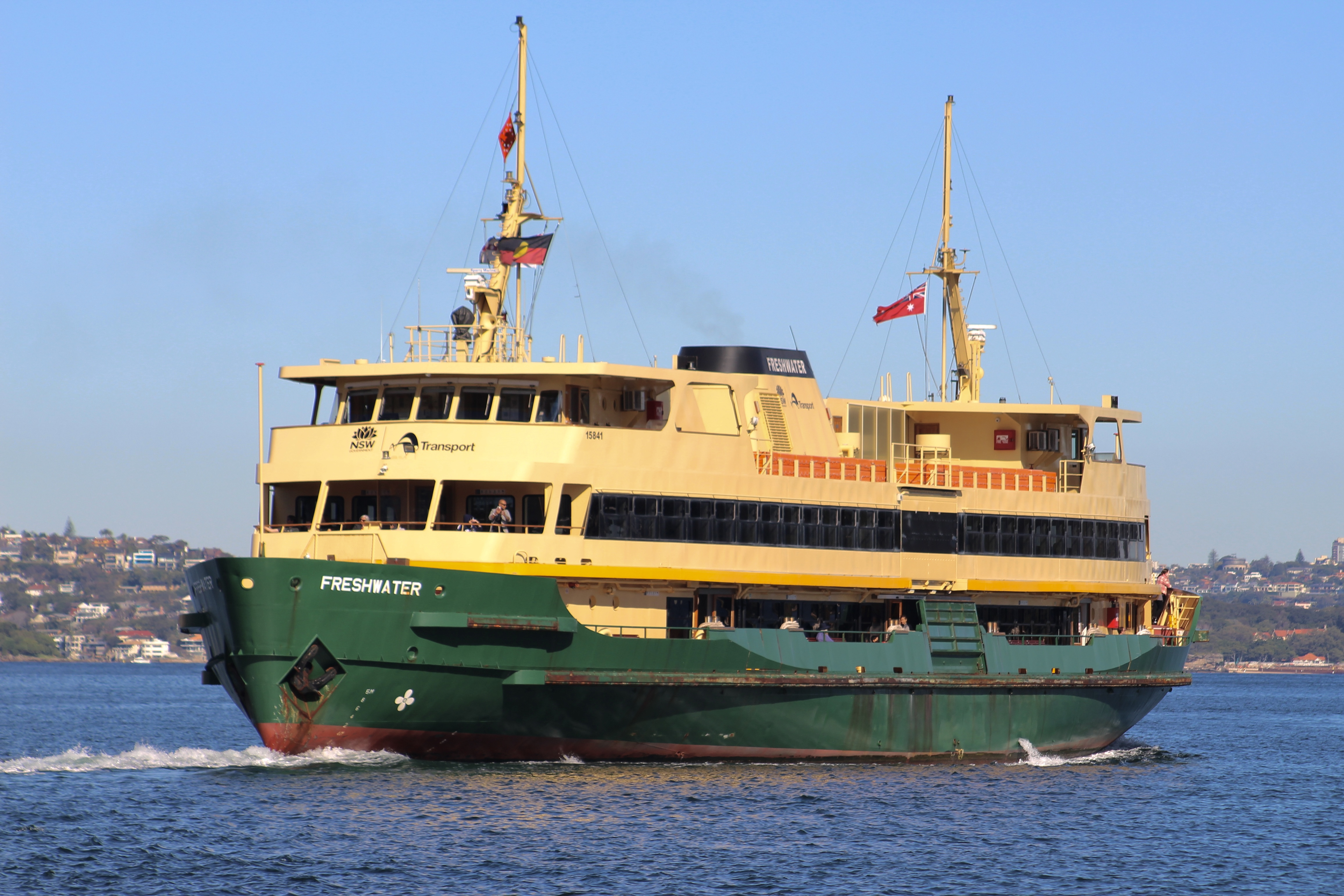
Freshwater departing Manly Cove in 2024 in her post 2021 refit livery. This livery was made standard during the reintroduction of the vessels.

Queenscliff was in storage at Cockatoo Island for around 18 months. In mid-2023, she was given a major refit, with a second drydock in August, which enabled her to be returned to service on 27 November 2023. Again this will allow the vessel to continue in service for another five years before this is required again (due in 2028).

Narrabeen was deteriorating in storage at Cockatoo Island after her "retirement" in 2021, but was intended to come back to service in 2022 after an engine rebuild. After much delay, it was announced that the engine rebuild was cancelled due to supply chain issues and expense, and the vessel was retired officially. However, after the 2023 state election transport minister Haylen announced that Narrabeen would return. Following a refit, including a rebuild of the engines and a new control system, she returned to full service in October 2025.

Collaroy was retired in 2023 after it was decided that it would not be economically viable to return her to duty due to her mechanical differences to her sisters. In January 2026, it was announced that Collaroy will be scrapped.

In September 2024, Transport for NSW announced that the Government would be opening a tender process for electric ferries on the Manly route.

== Vessels ==
=== Freshwater ===
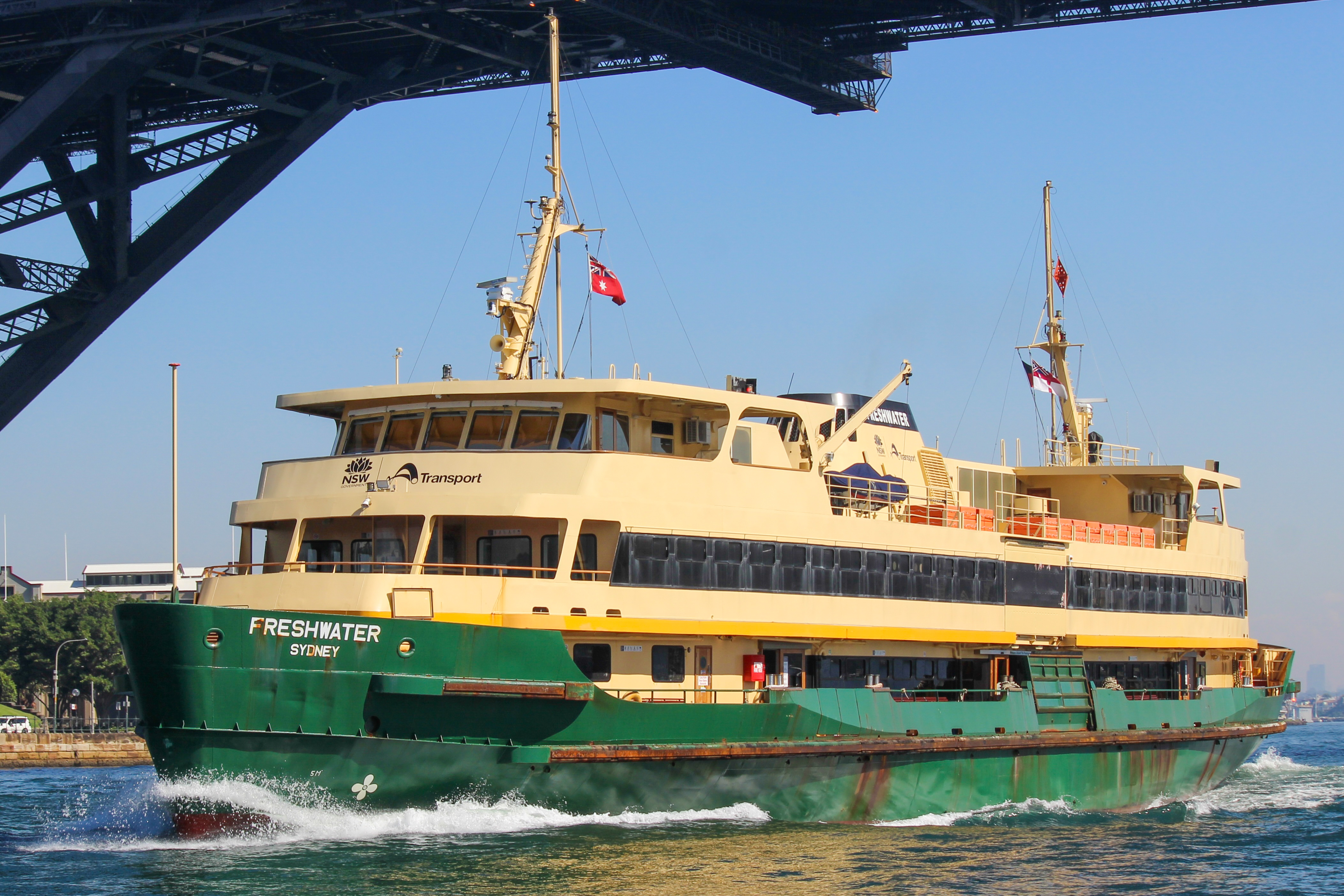
- Freshwater in 2025
- Namesake: Freshwater Beach
- Cost: $8.5 million
- Launched: 27 March 1982
- Completed: December 1982
- In service: 18 December 1982
- Identification: Call sign: VJ4671; IMO number: 7923914; MMSI number: 503603000
- Status: Out Of Service; Undergoing Refurbishment

MV Freshwater is the lead ship of the four Freshwater-class ferries. It is named after Freshwater Beach on Sydney's Northern Beaches. It was launched on 27 March 1982 by Olive Cox and commissioned by her husband, Minister for Transport Peter Cox, on 18 December 1982.

The three-month old ferry ran aground at Manly Cove in March 1983 after overshooting the wharf following a computer failure. On 30 March 1985, Freshwater was hijacked by a man who threatened to shoot passengers unless the captain piloted the ferry beyond Sydney Heads into the ocean. The hijacker was subdued after a police officer boarded the vessel and fired three warning shots. It turned out that the man, a New Zealander, had not been carrying a gun, but an empty vodka bottle (the second of two that he had consumed before boarding the vessel) had been concealed under his jacket. After a short jail sentence, the man returned to New Zealand in January 1986 by stowing away on the Oriana, for which he was also fined.

While there were plans to retire the ship by 2021, a decision was eventually made to keep Freshwater and Queenscliff operating, with Collaroy and Narrabeen to be retired. However, following the 2023 New South Wales state election, the plan was to maintain Freshwater, Queenscliff and Narrabeen in full-time service. Freshwater is currently undergoing refurbishment works, which will extend her life by 5 years once completed.

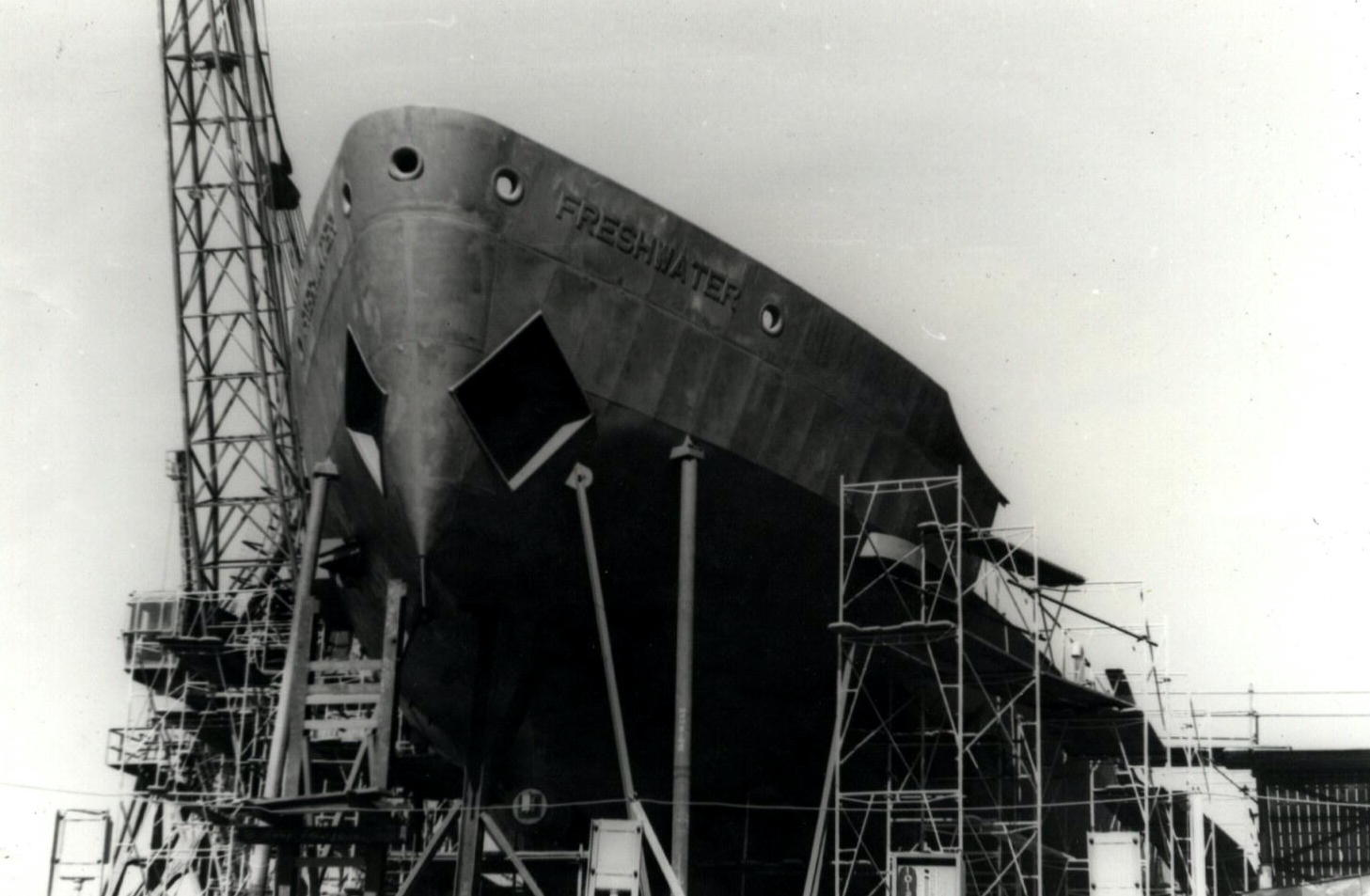
Under construction, NSW State Dockyard October 1981

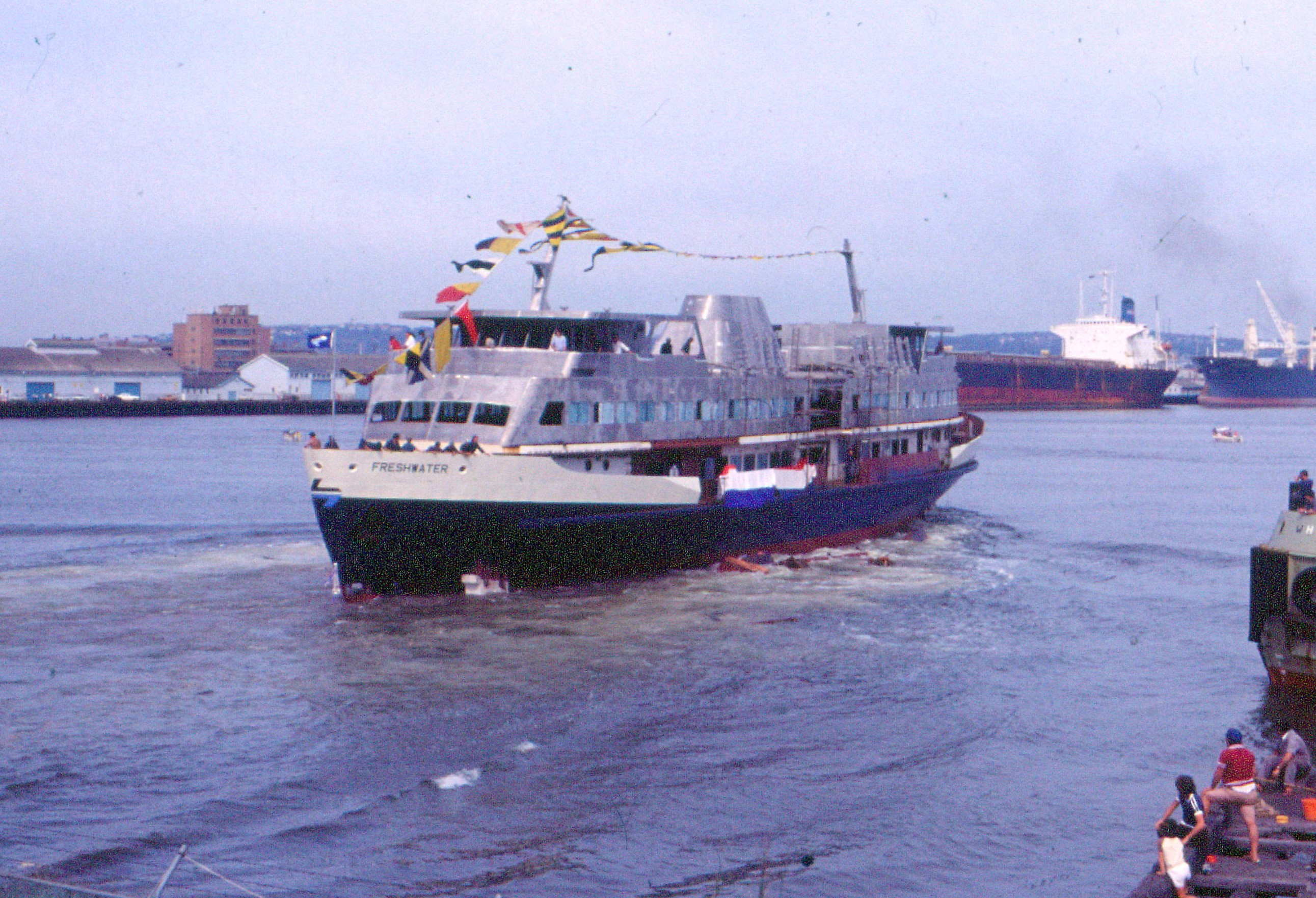
Launched, 27 March 1982

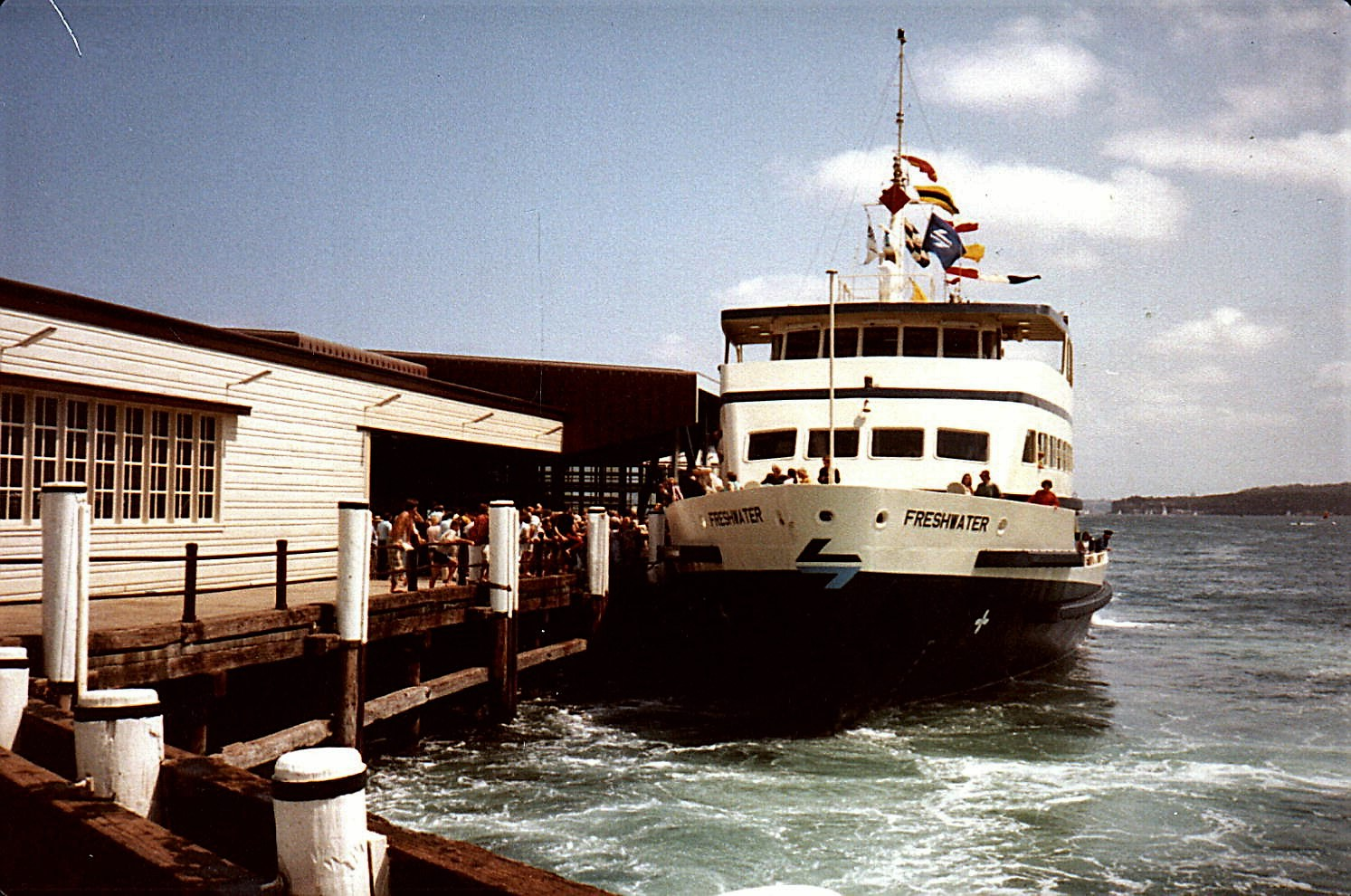
On her first run to Manly, 18 December 1982, in her original Urban Transit Authority livery and showing original window arrangement

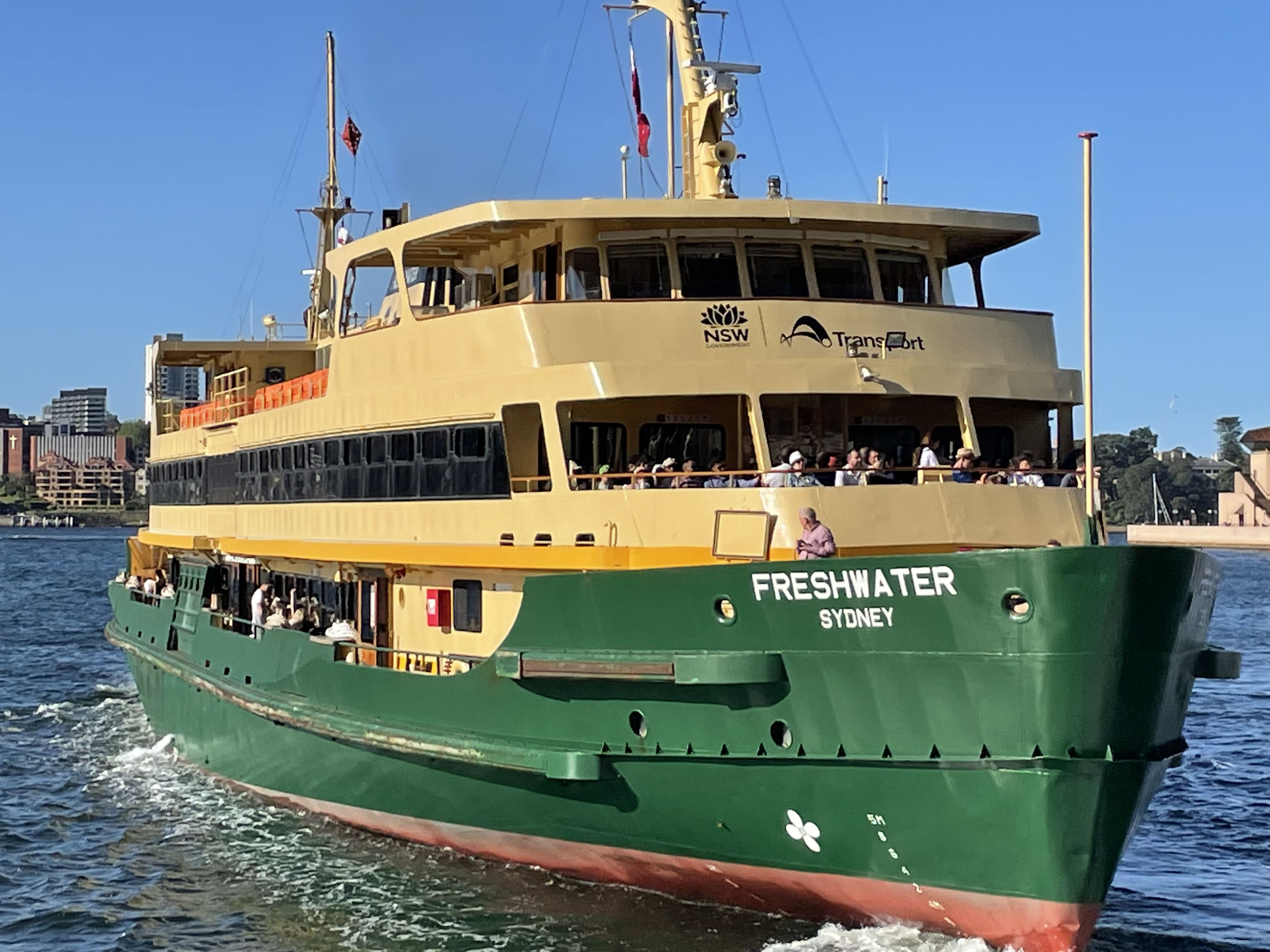
Freshwater departs Circular Quay displaying her opened upper deck seating areas; these were opened in the early 2000s.

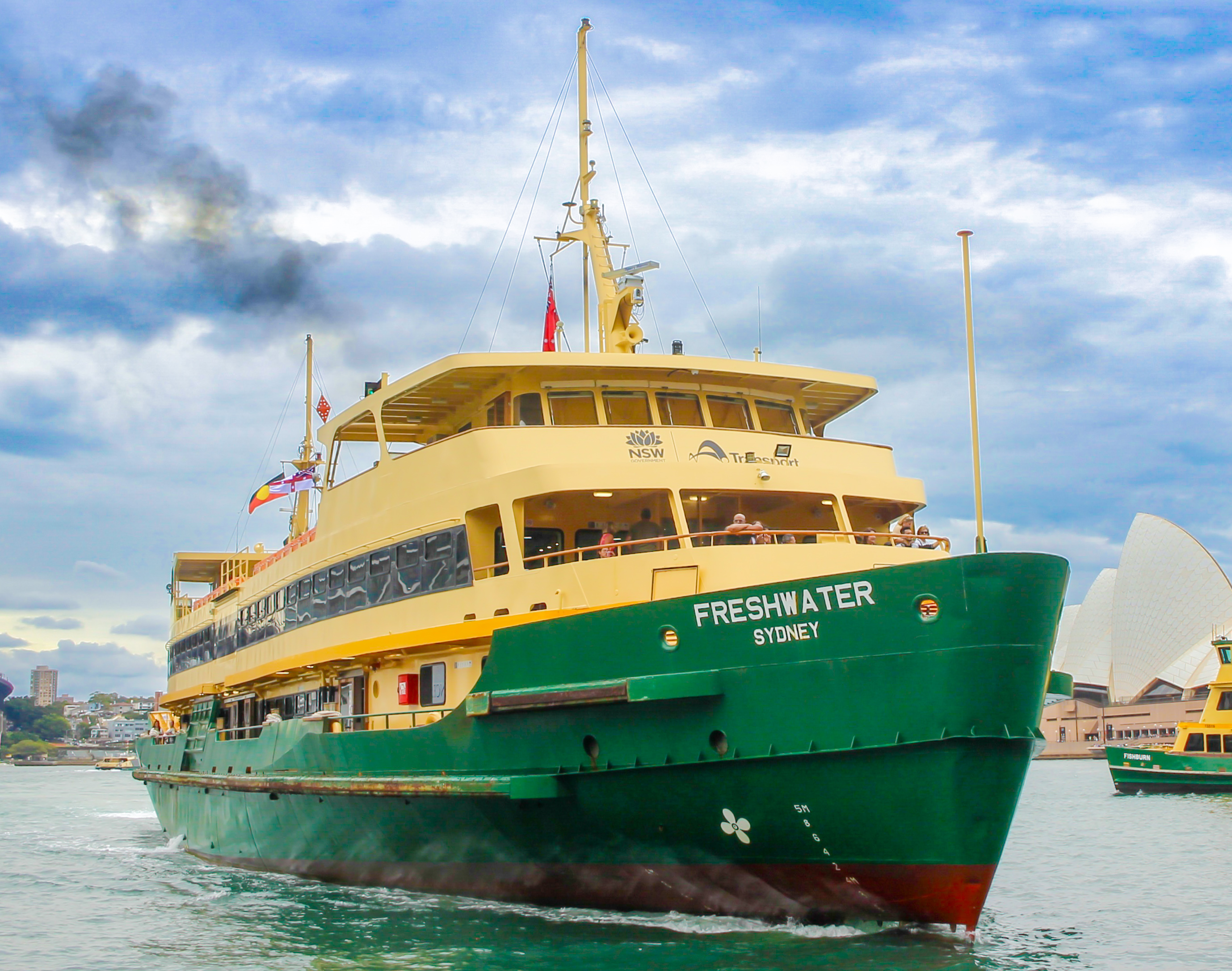
Freshwater arriving at Circular Quay

=== Queenscliff ===
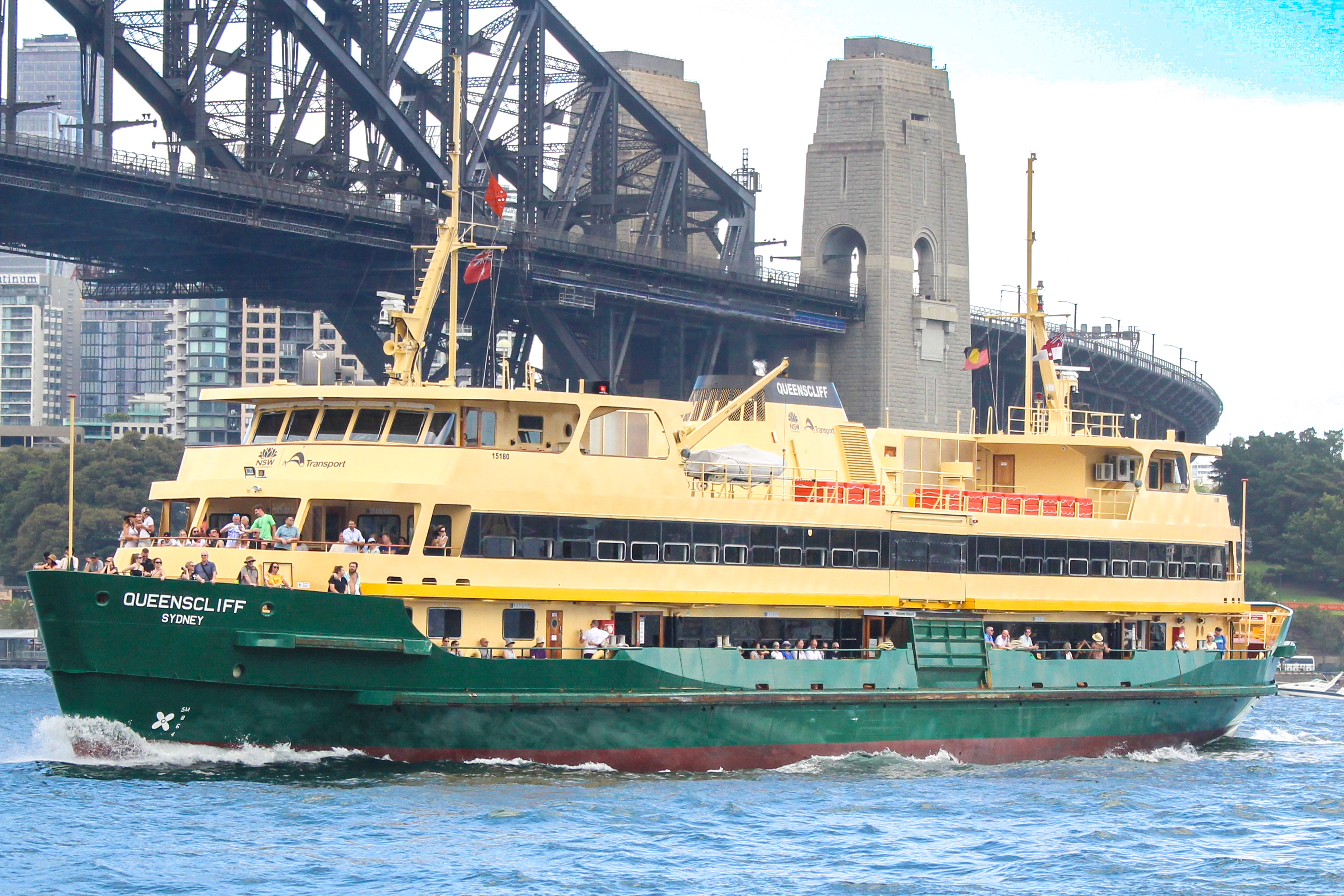
- Queenscliff in 2024
- Namesake: Queenscliff Beach
- Cost: $8.5 million
- Launched: 4 December 1982
- In service: 9 July 1983
- Identification: Call sign: 15180; IMO number: 8104058; MMSI number: 503605000
- Status: Operational in service

MV Queenscliff is the second of the four Freshwater-class ferries and entered service on 9 July 1983. It is named after Queenscliff Beach on Sydney's Northern Beaches. It was to be retired, operating its final service on 13 October 2021. However, on 13 June 2022 it was announced that Queenscliff would be brought back into service, after a refit, to replace Collaroy due to steering problems. After belated completion of a previously routine five-yearly dry docking, the vessel reentered service on Monday 27 November 2023.

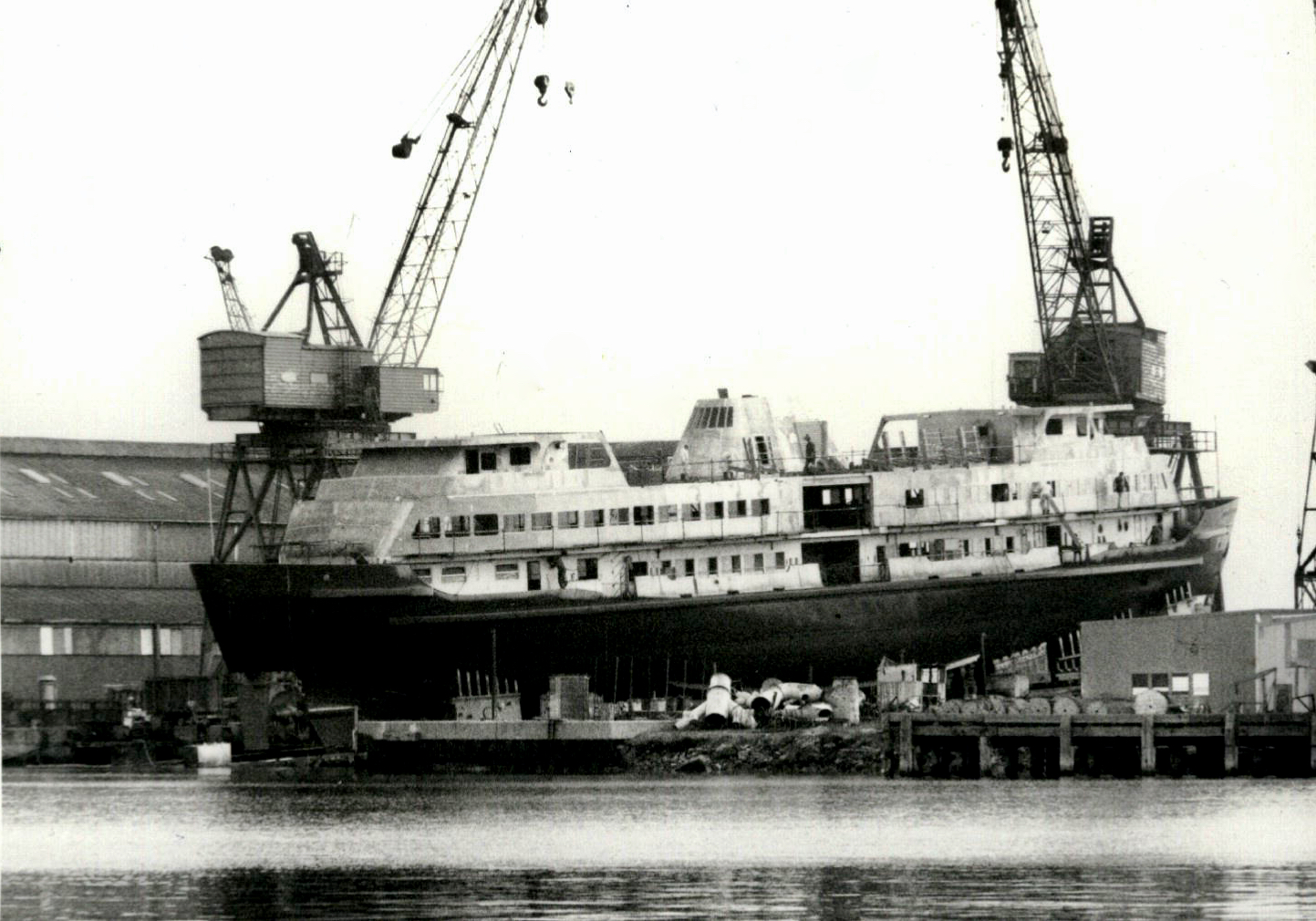
Under construction in Newcastle circa 1983

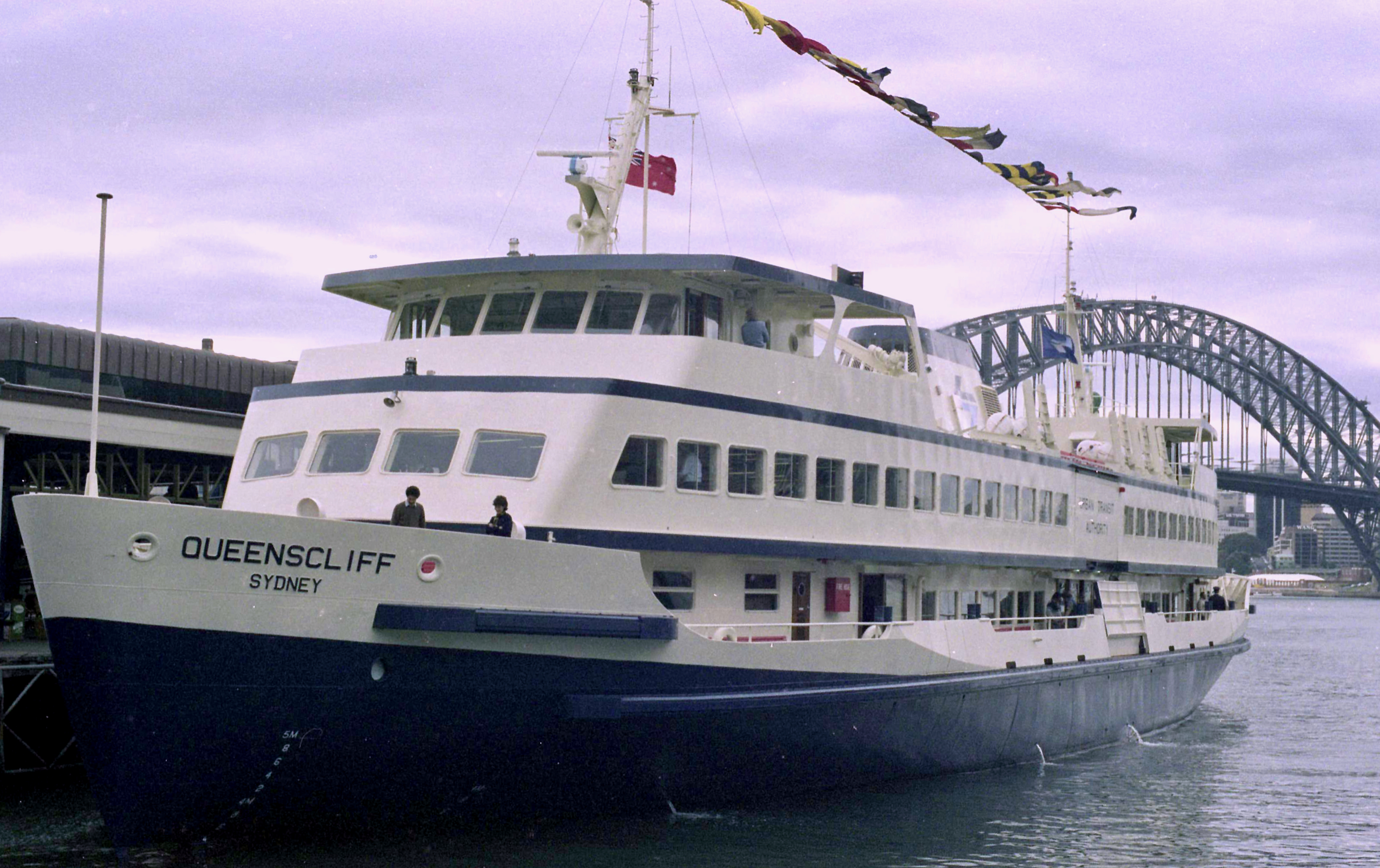
First day of service, 9 July 1983

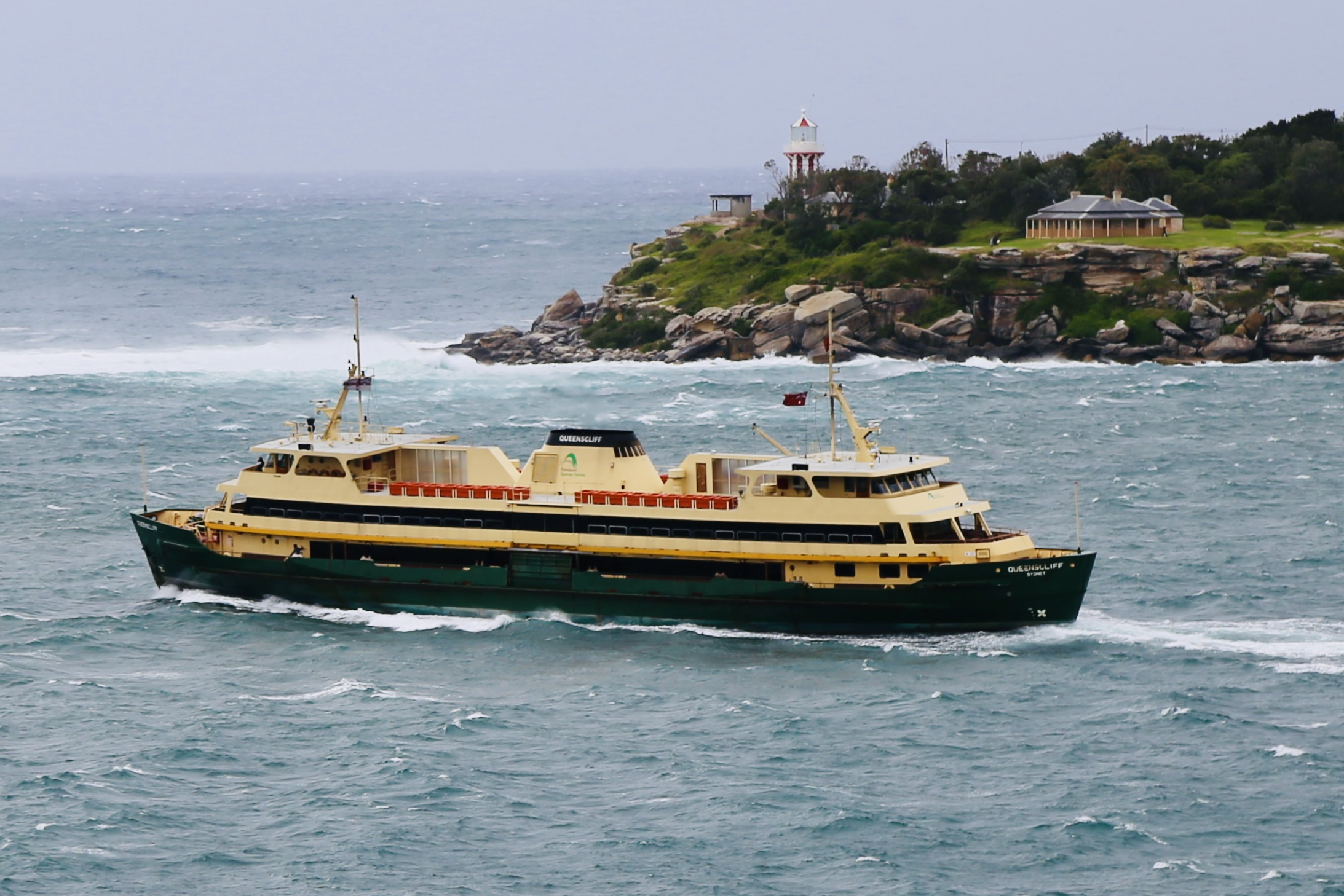
Queenscliff passing South Head, May 2020

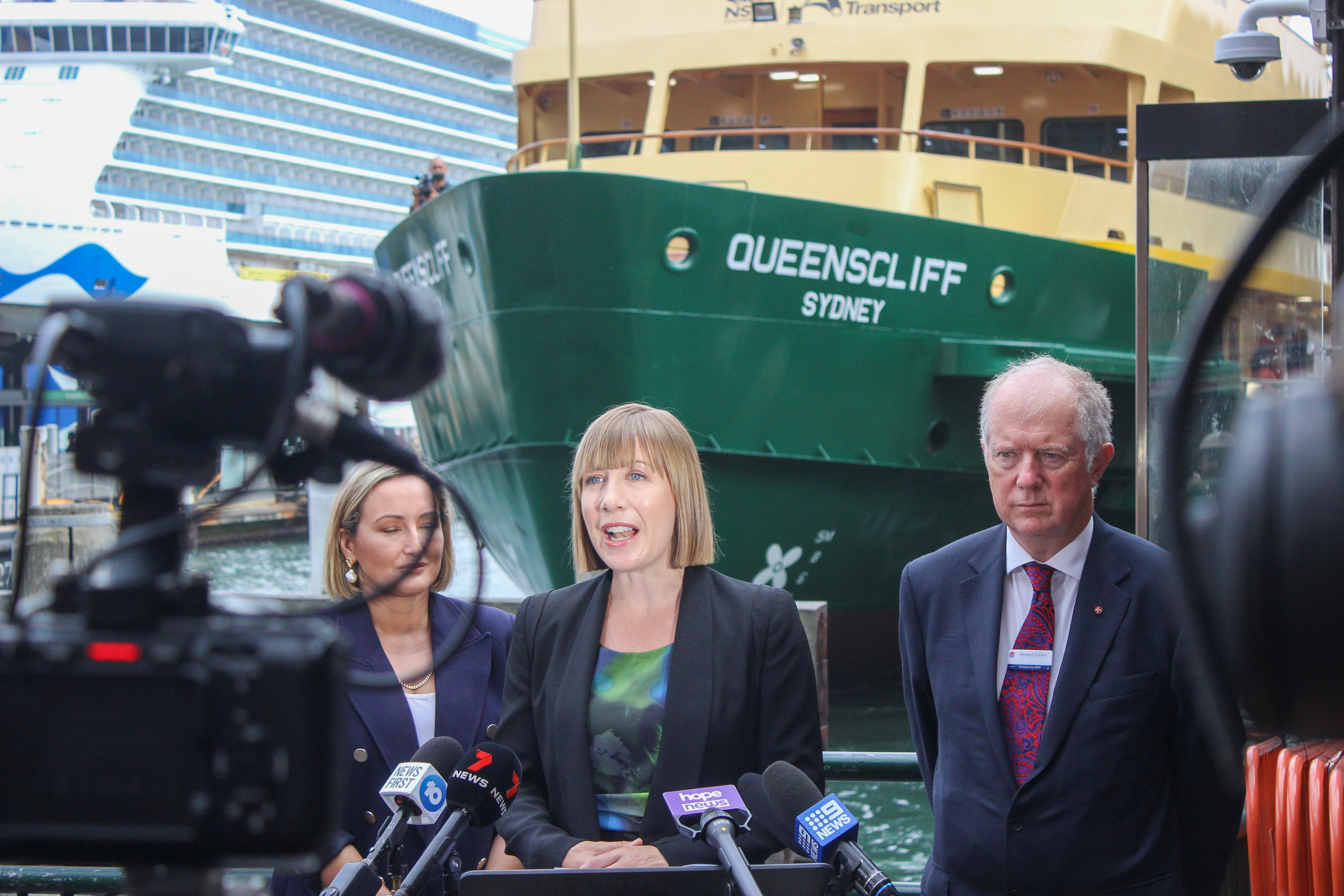
Queenscliff being returned to service on 27 November 2023. Transport Minister Jo Haylen is seen at a press conference before the vessel embarks on its first service since its retirement in 2021.

=== Narrabeen ===
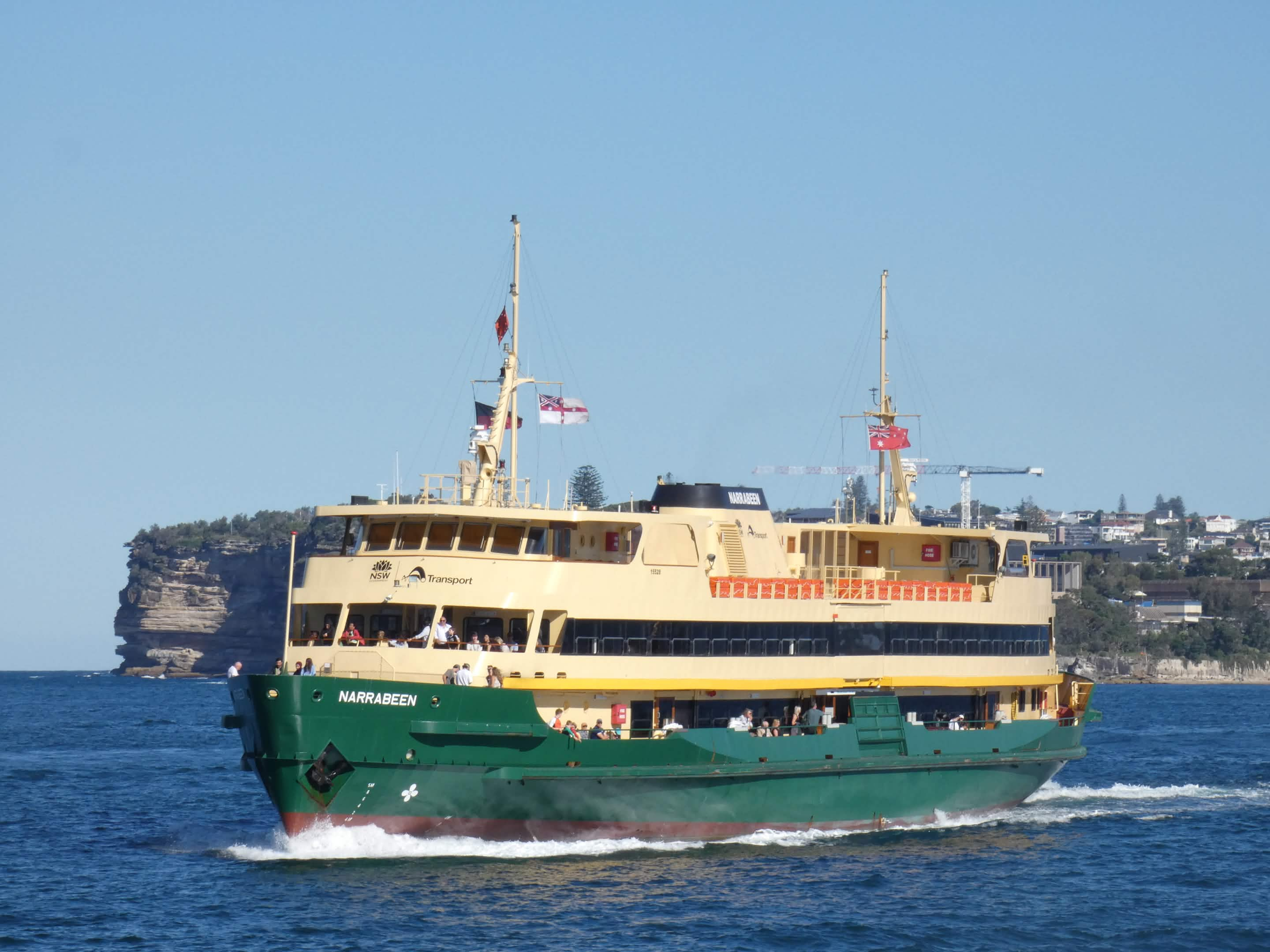
- Narrabeen in 2026 after its refurbishment in 2025.
- Namesake: Narrabeen Beach
- Cost: $8.9 million
- Launched: 26 May 1984
- In service: 1984
- Identification: Call sign: VJ7445; IMO number: 8310619; MMSI number: 503604000
- Status: Operational in service

MV Narrabeen is the third of the four Freshwater-class ferries to enter service. It is named after Narrabeen Beach on Sydney's Northern Beaches. Planned to be retired in 2021, on 9 December it was announced that Narrabeen would get a new engine and continue in service. However, after much delay it was announced that the engine rebuild was cancelled due to supply chain issues and expense and the vessel was officially retired. Nevertheless, after the 2023 New South Wales state election new Transport Minister Jo Haylen announced the return of Narrabeen. Following a refit, including a rebuild of the engines and a new control system, she returned to service on 20 October 2025.

This is the third Manly ferry to be called "Narrabeen". Narrabeen (I) was an 1886-built iron paddle-steamer that was hulked in 1917. Narrabeen (II) was built in 1921 and was the last of the Manly cargo ferries. She was sold out of the Manly run in 1928 and was wrecked in 1958.

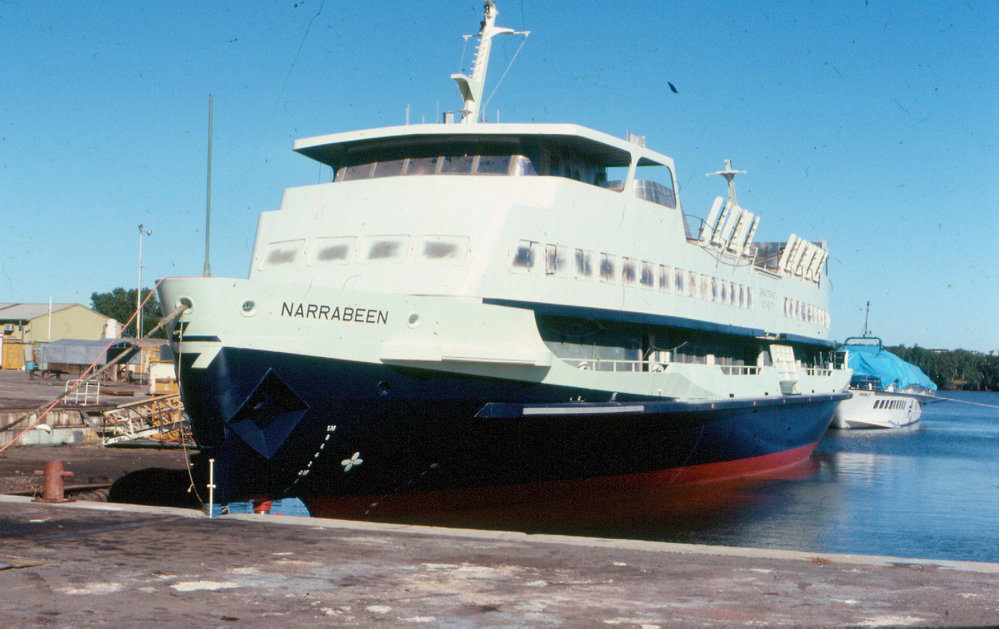
Narrabeen during fitting out in 1984

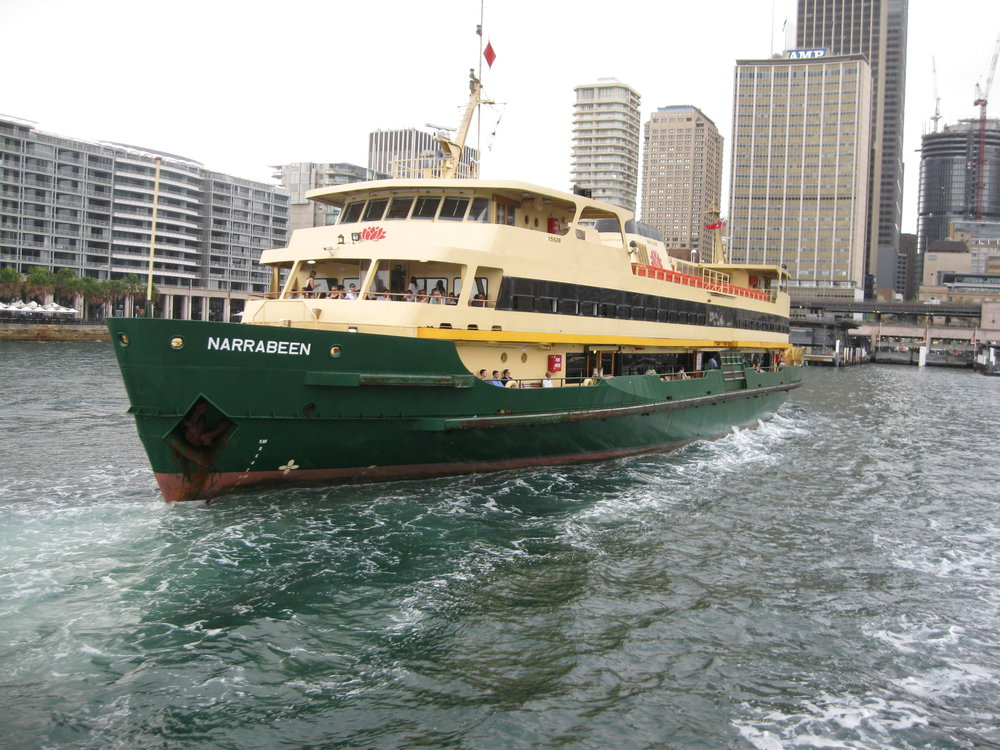
Narrabeen at Circular Quay in 2011

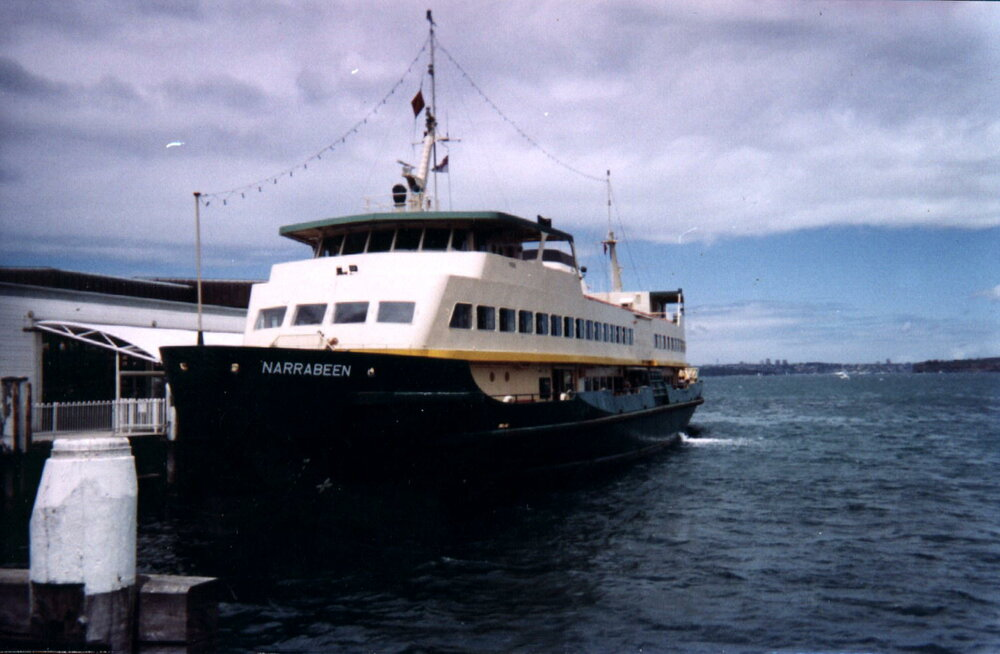
Narrabeen in Manly in 1990

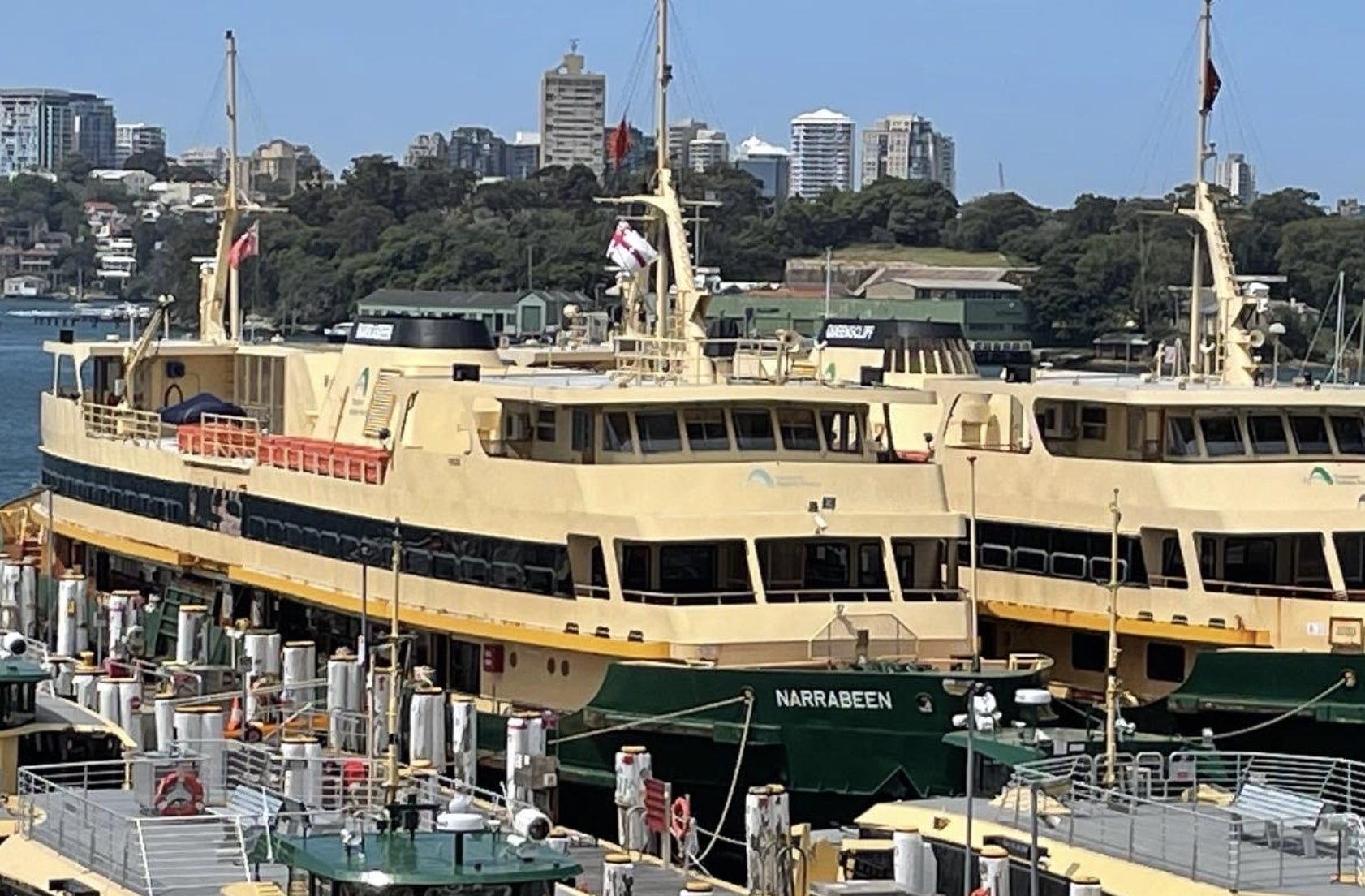
Narrabeen berthed next to Queenscliff at Balmain shipyard after the two vessels were taken out of service in 2021

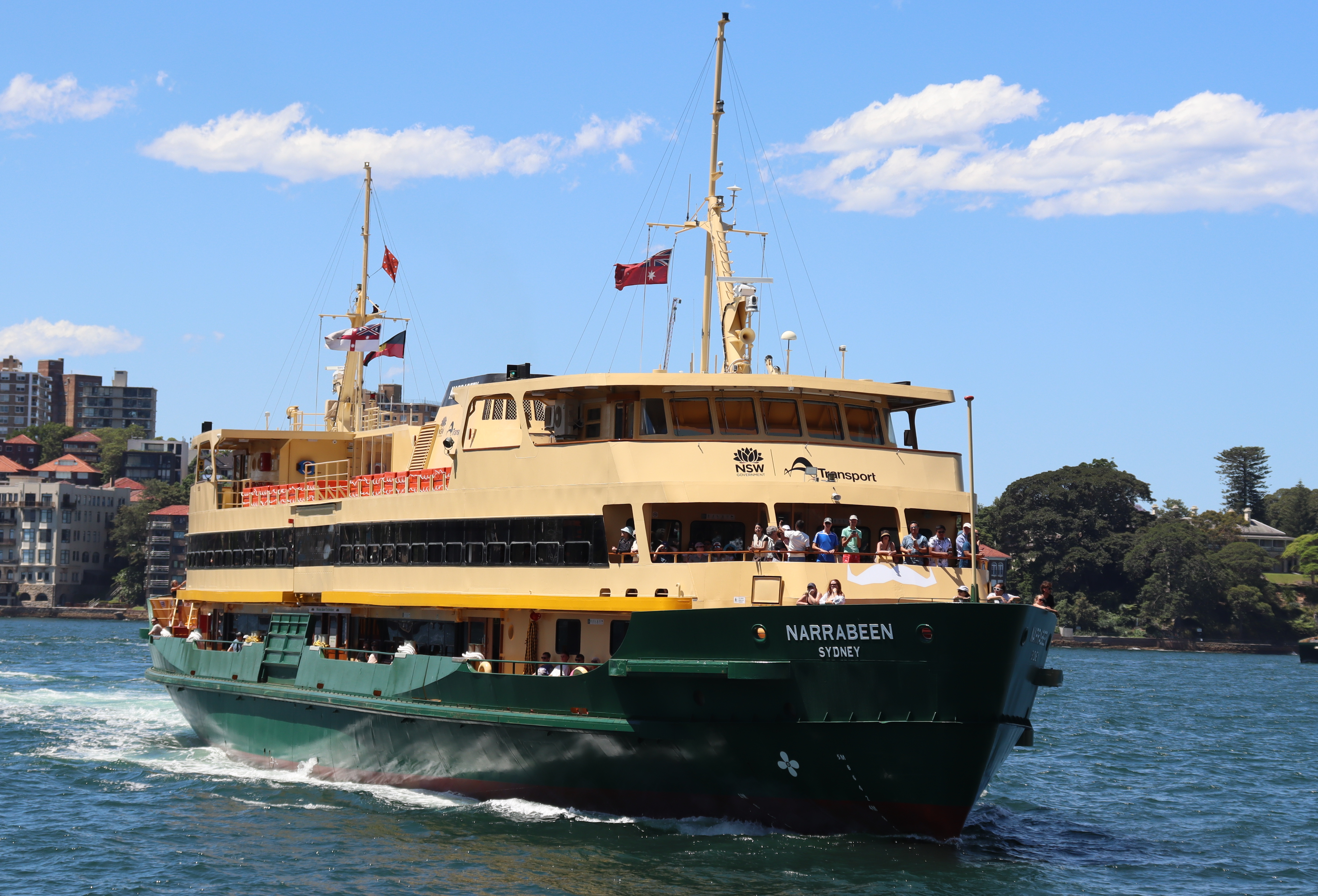
Narrabeen in Circular Quay after its refit in 2025

=== Collaroy ===
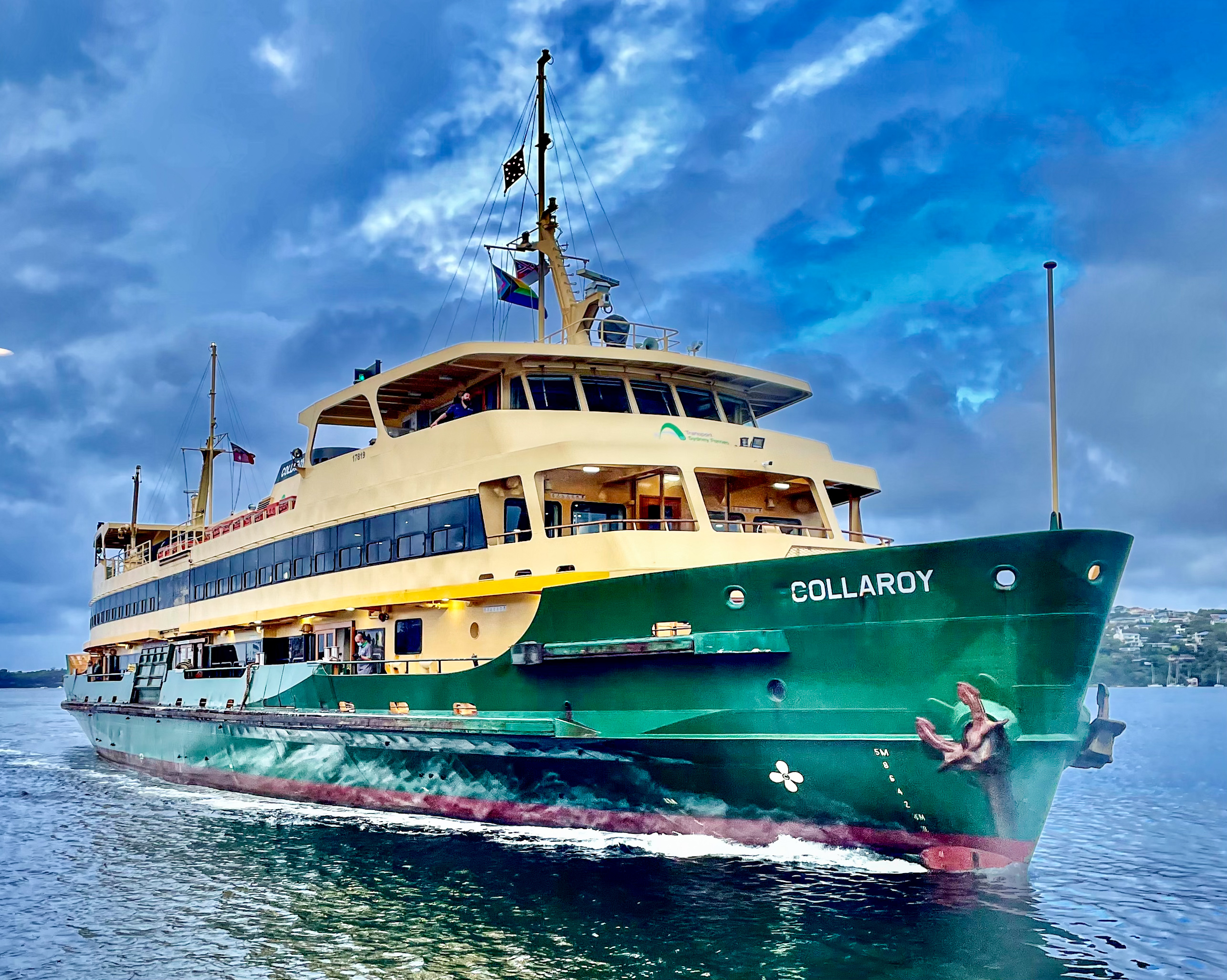
- Collaroy in 2022
- Namesake: Collaroy Beach
- Cost: $12 million
- Launched: 16 April 1988
- In service: 21 August 1988
- Identification: Call sign: VKN6270; IMO number: 8618281; MMSI number: 503607000
- Status: Retired 27 September 2023

MV Collaroy is the final Freshwater-class ferry to enter service. It is named after Collaroy Beach on Sydney's Northern Beaches.

Collaroy differs from her classmates in being equipped with underwater stabilisers, enhanced radar for use on ocean cruises, a reversed funnel, a "Becker" style rudder, different wheelhouse windows, and thicker hull plating, which altogether makes her the heaviest of the Freshwater-class ferries. The control systems were upgraded to match that being fitted during overhauls of the other Freshwater class. Collaroy was also fitted with outdoor seating areas at each end of the upper deck, which at the time was unique to her. After this outdoor seating proved popular with passengers, it was installed in the other three Freshwaters in the early 2000s.

When Sydney hosted the 2000 Summer Olympics, Collaroy was the vessel used to carry the Olympic Flame across Sydney Harbour. In February 2001, Collaroy ran aground on Manly Point, putting the ferry out of service for several months and costing $2 million to repair. Collaroy was originally meant to be retained along with Freshwater, operating on weekends and public holidays; however on 13 June 2022 it was announced that Collaroy would be retired and replaced with the previously retired Queenscliff after the latter had undergone a refit. It was announced that Collaroy might not return to service with her sisters, due to difficulty obtaining parts for her. She was retired on 27 September 2023, with her future uncertain. The vessel's future remained unknown until late 2024, when Haylen announced that Collaroy would not return to service and that the government would soon be inviting suggestions for future use of the vessel. In January 2026 it was announced that Collaroy would be scrapped due to "insufficient viable interest" in repurposing it.

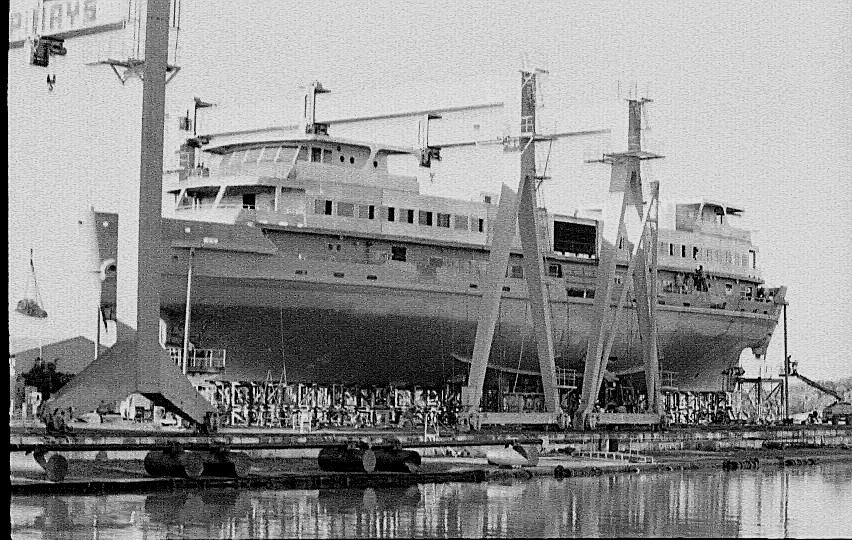
Collaroy under construction at Carrington Slipways

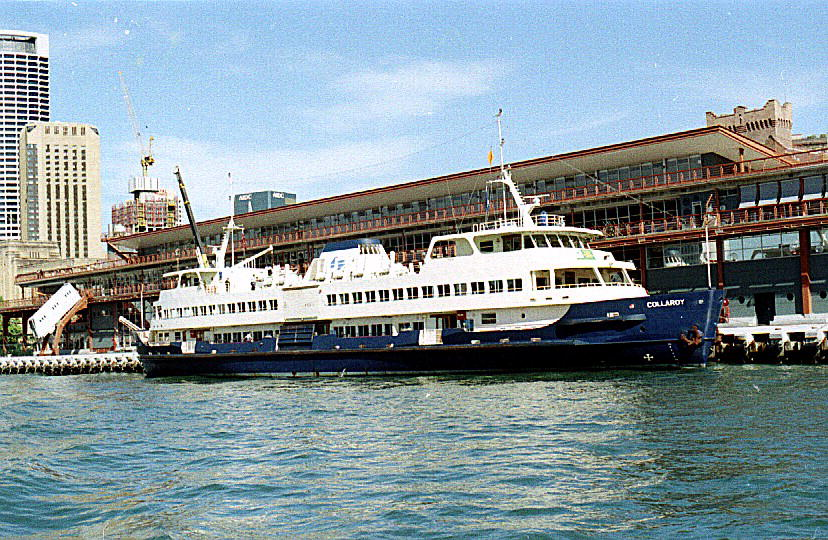
Collaroy docked at the Overseas Passenger Terminal in 1991

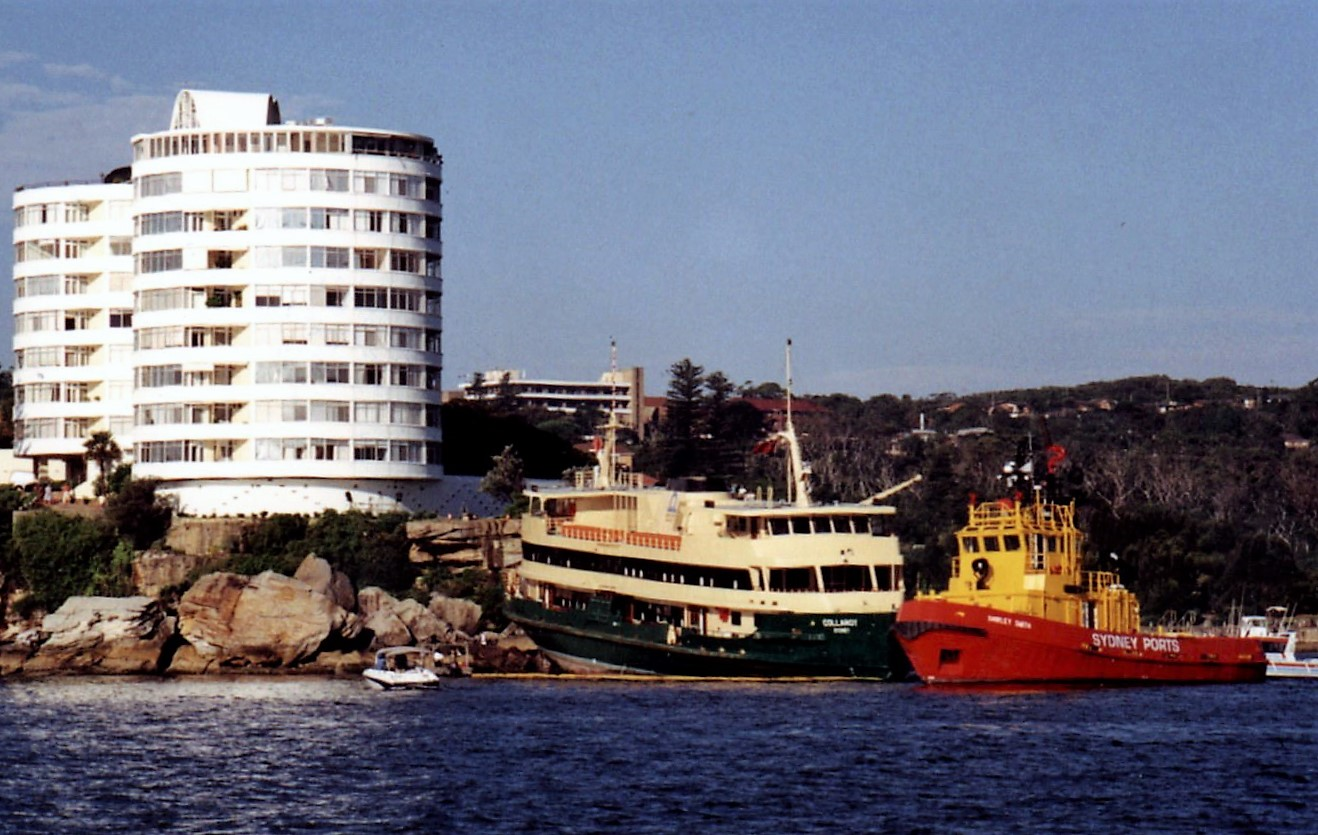
Collaroy aground near Kilburn Towers in Manly 2001

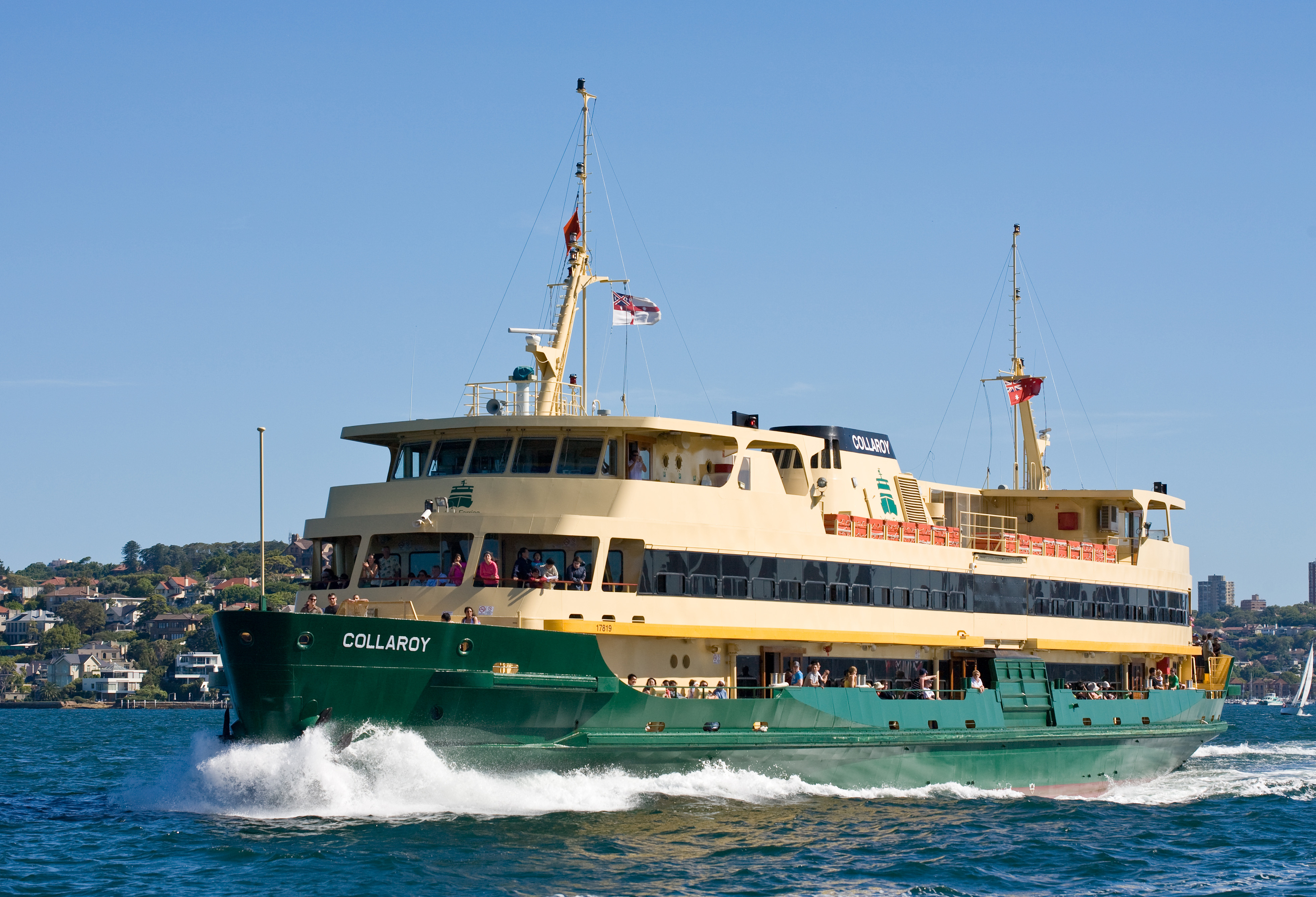
Collaroy in 2008

== See also ==
- List of Sydney Harbour ferries
- Timeline of Sydney Harbour ferries
