= Strahan (surname) =

Strahan is a surname. Notable people with the surname include:

- Art Strahan (born 1943), American football player for the Houston Oilers, Atlanta Falcons, and Orlando Panthers
- Frank Strahan (1886–1976), Australian public servant
- Freddie Strahan (1938–2024), Irish footballer
- Major Sir George Strahan (1838–1887), British colonial administrator and Governor of Tasmania (1881–1886)
- Colonel George Strahan (1839–1911), British army engineer and surveyor in India
- John Strahan, architect working in Bristol and Somerset around 1740
- Jonathan Strahan (born 1964), Australian editor and critic
- Michael Strahan (born 1971), American football player for the New York Giants and media personality
- Philip Strahan, American economist
- Reuben S. Strahan (1835–1895), American politician and judge in Oregon
- Ronald Strahan (1922–2010), Australian zoologist
- Sam Strahan (1944–2019), New Zealand rugby union player
- Tony Strahan (born 1946), Australian swimmer
- William Strahan (disambiguation), multiple people

== See also ==
- Strachan
