= State Dockyard =

20th century ship building facility in Carrington, New South Wales, Australia

Coordinates: 32°55′21.4″S 151°46′30.4″E

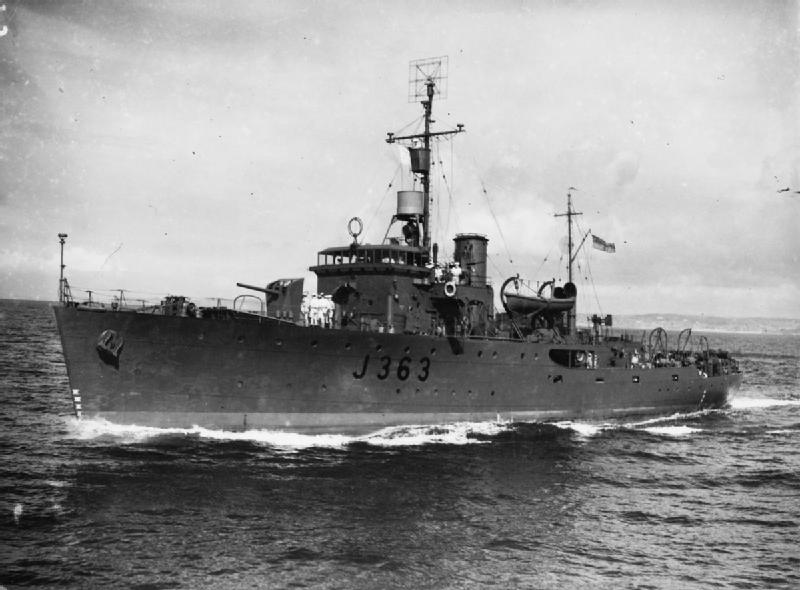
- HMAS Strahan
- Industry: Ship building
- Predecessor: Government Dockyard
- Founded: 1942
- Founder: Government of New South Wales
- Defunct: 1987
- Fate: Closed
- Headquarters: Newcastle, New South Wales, Australia
- Owner: Government of New South Wales

The State Dockyard was a ship building and maintenance facility operated by the Government of New South Wales in Carrington, Newcastle, New South Wales, Australia between 1942 and 1987.

== History ==
In 1942, the State Dockyard opened on the site of the Government Dockyard at Dyke Point in Newcastle that had closed in 1933. Officially the New South Wales Government Engineering & Shipbuilding Undertaking, it was universally referred to as the State Dockyard. The dockyard facility was located at Carrington on Newcastle Harbour, on 11 ha (27 acres) of land in addition to the ship repairs site on 3 ha (7 acres).

The dockyard launched its first vessel in July 1943. By the end of World War II, it had launched two ships for the Royal Australian Navy and 22 vessels for the United States and had repaired six hundred ships.

With the cessation of large scale shipbuilding, in the 1970s it diversified into other engineering disciplines. In November 1986 a team of apprentices from the Hunter Valley Training Company completed a three-year overhaul of steam locomotive 3801 at the dockyard. The dockyard closed on 3 March 1987.

A 15,000 ton floating dock was located at Carrington in 1943 to repair damaged ships during World War II. The floating dock was scrapped in 1977 and replaced with a new one built in Japan called Muloobinba, which was eventually sold overseas in 2012.

== Ships built ==
Princess of Tasmania under construction in 1958

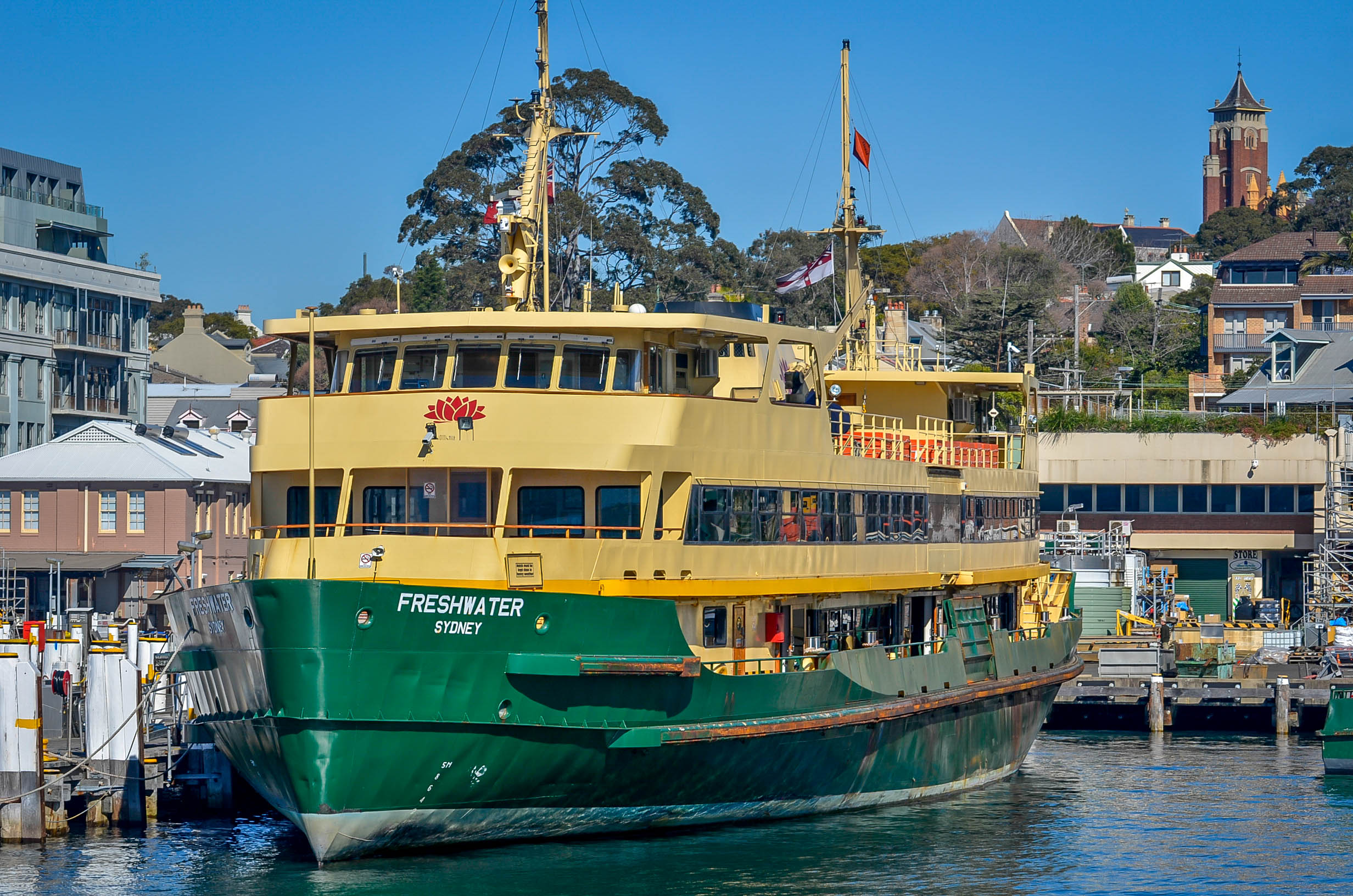
Sydney Ferries' Freshwater at Balmain depot in July 2013

- HMAS Strahan (1943)
- HMAS Condamine (1944)
- Dorrigo (1946)
- Dubbo (1947)
- Delungra (1947)
- Denman (1949)
- Kabbarli (1951, yard # 28) for Stateships
- Townsville (1952)
- Woomera (1952)
- Wangarra (1953)
- Warringa/Windarra (1953)
- Kooleen (1956)
- Koojarra (1956, yard # 59) for Stateships
- Iranda (1957)
- Princess of Tasmania (1959)
- Bass Trader (1961, yard # 64)
- Holyman (1961) for Holyman (company)
- Cape Don (1962) Lighthouse supply vessel
- Dredge John Main (1962) For NSW Public Works
- Cape Moreton (1963) Lighthouse supply vessel
- Moresby (1963) For Burns Philp to and from New Guinea
- HMAS Moresby (1963)
- Cape Pillar (1964) Lighthouse supply vessel
- Kooringa (1964)
- BP Endeavour (1967) for BP
- BP Enterprise (1968) for BP
- Australian Trader (1969)
- Lady Cutler (1968)
- Lady Woodward (1970)
- Lady McKell (1970)
- Darwin Trader (1970)
- Dredge Geopodes (1971) For a Dutch dredging company
- Dredge WD Resolution (1971) For Westminster dredging company
- Lysaght Endeavour (1973) for Australian National Line
- Lysaght Enterprise (1973) for Australian National Line
- Express (1974) For Howard Smith
- John Hunter (1975) For Caltex
- Bass Trader (1976, yard # 94)
- Flinders Range (1976) for Australian National Line
- Selwyn Range (1977, yard # 96)
- Lady Street (1979)
- Lady Herron (1979)
- Freshwater (1982, yard # 105)
- Queenscliff (1983, yard # 106, final vessel built)

== Surviving ships ==
As of September 2025, the surviving State Dockyard built ships still in service are the Manly ferries Freshwater and Queenscliff, which are operated by Transdev Sydney Ferries. Former Sydney Harbour ferries Lady Cutler and Lady McKell operate as cruise boats on Port Phillip.

Surviving non-operating or stored ships built by State Dockyard, are Cape Don, a lighthouse tender built in 1962 for the Commonwealth Lighthouse Service which is now a museum ship at Balls Head Bay, Waverton.
