= William Strahan =

William Strahan may refer to:

- William Strahan (publisher) (1715–1785), printer and publisher
- William Henry Strahan (1869–1915), Australian soldier and poet
- William Strahan (cricketer) (1807–1886), English cricketer
- William Strahan, partner in the Strahan, Paul & Bates bank which collapsed in 1855
