= Grace Strachan =

American educator

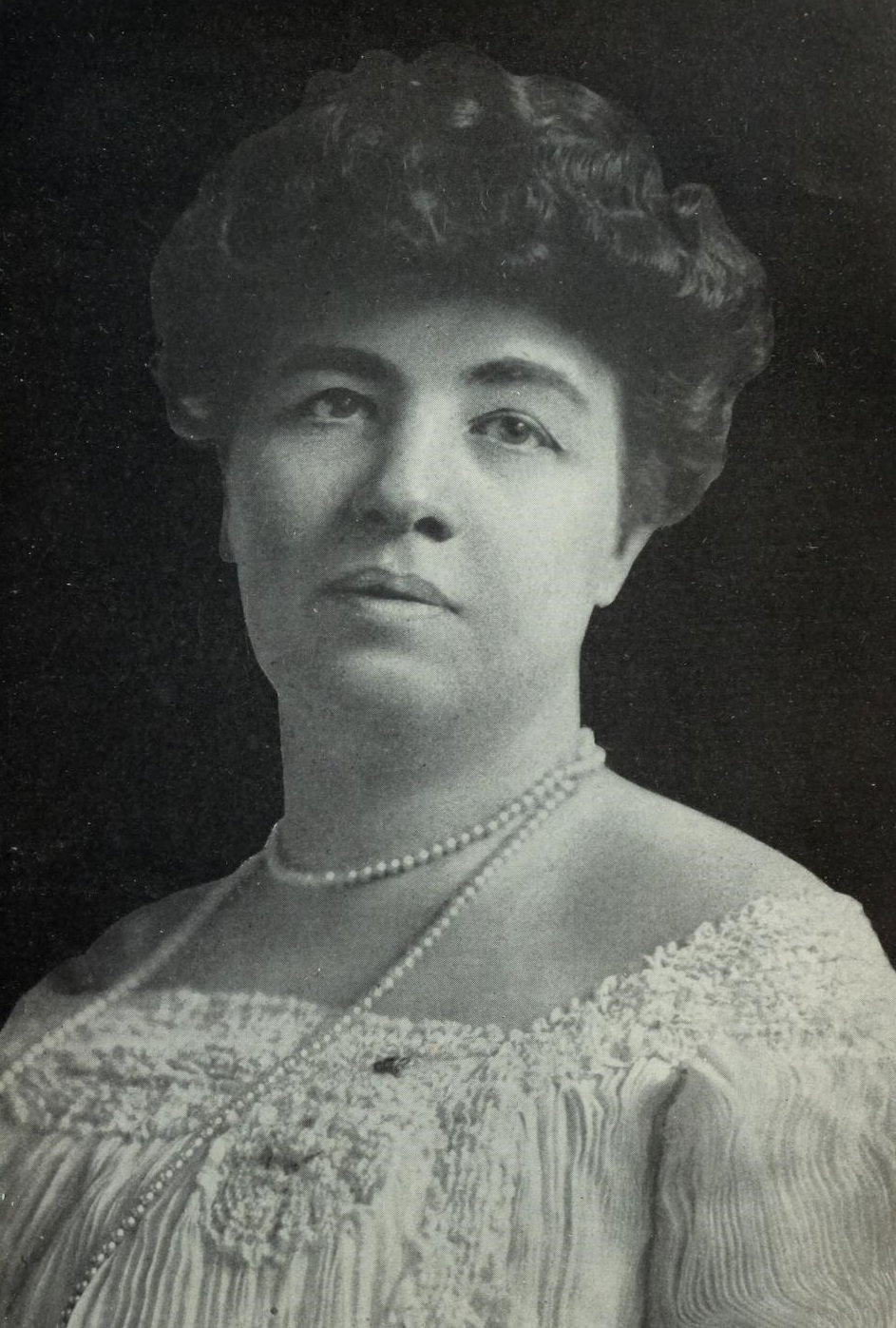
- Strachan, from a 1911 portrait
- Born: Grace Charlotte Strachan; November 27, 1863; Buffalo, New York, U.S.
- Died: July 21, 1922 (aged 58); Brooklyn, New York, U.S.
- Other name: Grace Strachan Forsythe
- Occupations: Educator, labor leader

Grace Charlotte Strachan Forsythe (November 27, 1863 – July 21, 1922) was an American educator and labor leader. She led a successful campaign for equal pay for women teachers in early twentieth-century New York City.

== Early life and education ==
Strachan was born in Buffalo, New York, one of the nine children born to Thomas F. Strachan and Maria Byrne Strachan. Her father was born in Scotland and her mother was born in Ireland. She graduated from St. Brigid's School and the State Normal School in Buffalo, with further studies at New York University.

== Career ==
Strachan taught school in Buffalo and was a school principal and assistant superintendent in Brooklyn. She was co-founder and president of the Interborough Association of Women Teachers. She led thousands of women teachers campaigning for equal pay in New York City schools. After the equal pay fight was won in 1911, Strachan's methods were questioned, with rumors of a $200,000 endowment fund for her, raised from city teachers. "I not only do not know of any such gift, but I would not stand for it if it were offered," she told The New York Times.

While Strachan was a leader for equal pay, she worked against teachers' rights in other ways. She opposed married women teachers, and especially pregnant teachers, in contrast to Henrietta Rodman of the Teachers' League. During World War I, she advocated for firing teachers who held foreign citizenship.

Strachan was defeated in runs for president of the National Education Association in 1912 and 1915. In 1920, she acknowledged an interest a federal-level appointment, or in a Congressional seat. In January 1922, she was elected Associate Superintendent of Schools, the first time a woman held that position in New York City. She took sick leave beginning in March, and resigned weeks before her death in July of that year.

== Publications ==
- Equal Pay for Equal Work: The Story of the Struggle for Justice Being Made by the Women Teachers of the City of New York (1910)

== Personal life ==
Strachan married her publicist, Timothy J. Forsythe, in 1917; she was 43, and he was 24, at the time. She died in 1922, at the age of 58, in Brooklyn.
