= HMAS Strahan =

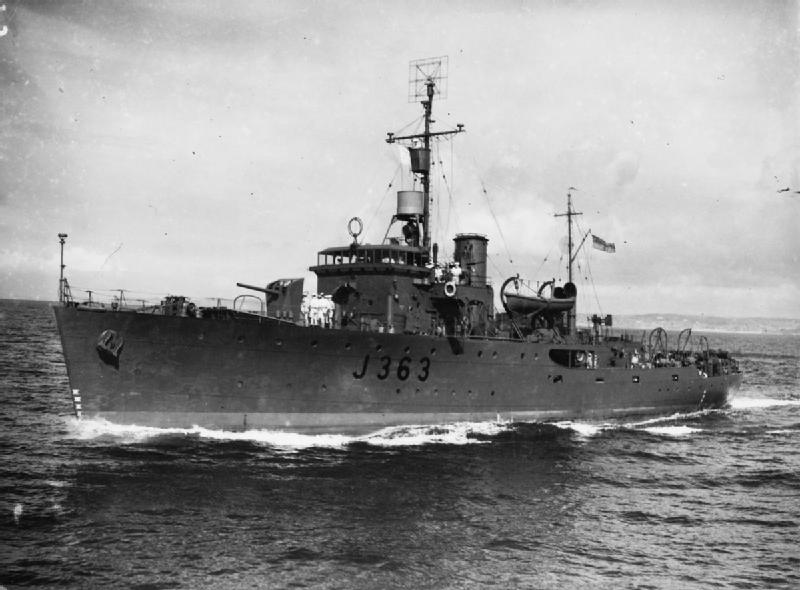

History

Australia
- Namesake: Town of Strahan, Tasmania
- Builder: State Dockyard, Newcastle, New South Wales
- Laid down: 9 October 1942
- Launched: 12 July 1943
- Commissioned: 14 March 1944
- Decommissioned: 25 January 1946
- Motto: "With Fair Winds"
- Honours and awards: Battle honours: Pacific 1944–45; New Guinea 1944
- Fate: Sold for scrap in 1961, broken up in 1963
- Badge

General characteristics
- Class & type: Bathurst-class corvette
- Displacement: 815 tons
- Length: 186 ft 2 in (56.74 m)
- Beam: 31 ft (9.4 m)
- Draught: 8.5 ft (2.6 m)
- Propulsion: triple expansion engine, 2 shafts, 2,000 horsepower
- Speed: 15.5 knots (28.7 km/h; 17.8 mph)
- Complement: 85
- Armament: 1 × 4 inch Mk XIX gun; 2 × 20 mm Oerlikons; 1 × Bofors 40 mm L/60 gun; Machine guns; Depth charges chutes and throwers

HMAS Strahan (J363/M363), named for the town of Strahan, Tasmania, was one of 60 Bathurst-class corvettes constructed during World War II, and one of 36 initially manned and commissioned solely by the Royal Australian Navy (RAN).

== Design and construction ==
In 1938, the Australian Commonwealth Naval Board (ACNB) identified the need for a general purpose 'local defence vessel' capable of both anti-submarine and mine-warfare duties, while easy to construct and operate. The vessel was initially envisaged as having a displacement of approximately 500 tons, a speed of at least 10 knots (19 km/h; 12 mph), and a range of 2,000 nautical miles (3,700 km; 2,300 mi) The opportunity to build a prototype in the place of a cancelled Bar-class boom defence vessel saw the proposed design increased to a 680-ton vessel, with a 15.5 knots (28.7 km/h; 17.8 mph) top speed, and a range of 2,850 nautical miles (5,280 km; 3,280 mi), armed with a 4-inch gun, equipped with asdic, and able to fitted with either depth charges or minesweeping equipment depending on the planned operations: although closer in size to a sloop than a local defence vessel, the resulting increased capabilities were accepted due to advantages over British-designed mine warfare and anti-submarine vessels. Construction of the prototype HMAS Kangaroo did not go ahead, but the plans were retained. The need for locally built 'all-rounder' vessels at the start of World War II saw the "Australian Minesweepers" (designated as such to hide their anti-submarine capability, but popularly referred to as "corvettes") approved in September 1939, with 60 constructed during the course of the war: 36 (including Strahan) ordered by the RAN, 20 ordered by the British Admiralty but manned and commissioned as RAN vessels, and 4 for the Royal Indian Navy.

Strahan was laid down by the State Dockyard at Newcastle, New South Wales on 9 October 1942. She was launched on 12 July 1943 by Mrs. J. J. Cahill, wife of the Minister for Public Works and Local Government, and commissioned into the RAN on 14 March 1944.

== Operational history ==
Strahan began her career in May 1944, arriving in New Guinea after completing trials to serve as an escort and anti-submarine vessel. In October 1944, Strahan was present in Morotai Harbour when the recently captured island was attacked by Japanese aircraft. The corvette was attacked by a dive-bomber, but was able to drive off the Japanese plane before she was damaged. The aircraft was then destroyed by an American Bofors shore installation, but there claims that Strahan's 4-inch gun had seriously damaged the aircraft, and that it was in an uncontrollable dive when the Bofors blew it up.

In May 1945, Strahan travelled to Adelaide via Sydney, where she underwent a refit. Following this, she was immediate deployed back in New Guinea, and in June 1945 fired upon Japanese gun emplacements on Kairiru Island. In August, the corvette sank a Japanese supply craft off Tarakan, and captured three survivors.

Following the end of World War II, Strahan was assigned to the 21st Minesweeping Flotilla in Hong Kong, and performed in minesweeping and anti-piracy patrols. On 26 September, an acoustic mine detonated under Strahan's stern while the corvette was pursuing Chinese pirates. Her rudder was damaged, and she had to be towed into Hong Kong Harbour by sister ship Wagga. She was repaired, and returned to Australia. In November, Strahan visited her namesake town. During the visit, a leading seaman drowned; the only casualty in the ship's life. Strahan was decommissioned into reserve in Sydney on 25 January 1946, having sailed almost 60,000 nautical miles (110,000 km; 69,000 mi) in her two-year career.

The corvette received two battle honours for her wartime service: "Pacific 1944–45" and "New Guinea 1944".

== Fate ==
Strahan was sold to the Kinoshita Australia company for scrap on 6 January 1961. She was broken up at Green Point in Sydney during March 1963.
