= Allerdyce Strachan =

Bahamian law enforcement officer

Allerdyce Cooper Strachan
- Born: Strachan; Eleuthera
- Citizenship: The Bahamas
- Occupation: Peace officer
- Known for: Police officer
- Awards: Meritorious Award Prison Fellowship Award Zonta Club of New Providence Living Legends Award

Allerdyce Cooper Strachan is a Bahamian law enforcement officer. Strachan was a Superintendent of Police within the Royal Bahamas Police Force, the first woman to rise to that rank.

== Early life and education ==
Allerdyce Cooper was born in Rock Sound, Eleuthera to Otis and Madeline Cooper.

During her childhood she attended school in Eleuthera as well as in Grand Bahama. After finishing high school, Cooper worked as a teacher's assistant in Eleuthera until 1964.

== Law enforcement career ==
Strachan joined The Royal Bahamas Police Force in 1965. She worked in the Criminal Investigation Department for 26 years. In 1993 with Police Commissioner Bonamy, Strachan started a free summer camp for youth. In 1996, Strachan was promoted to Superintendent of Police, the first woman to hold the position. In 1999, she retired from active duty.

Strachan was Vice President of the International Association of Community Police Officers from 1996 to 1999.

== Recognition and later life ==
Strachan was recognized by The Royal Bahamas Police Force as Best Recruit in 1965. She was awarded a Good Conduct Medal in 1984, a Meritorious Award in 1985. She received the Silver Jubilee Award from the Government of the Commonwealth of The Bahamas in 1998.

Strachan was a recipient of the Zonta Club of New Providence Living Legends Award in 2000, The Royal Bahamas Police Force Silver Salvo Award in 2003, and the Prison Fellowship Award.

Strachan is the founding Secretary of The Royal Bahamas Police Force Retired Officers Association.
