= Edeline =

Edeline may refer to:

== People ==
=== First name ===
- Edeline Lee, Canadian fashion designer
- Edeline Strickland (1870–1918), British Australian philanthropist

=== Middle name ===
- Mabel Edeline Strickland (1899–1988), British Maltese journalist and politician

== Places ==
- Edeline Islands, Australia
- Bosc-Édeline, France

== Other ==
- Lady Edeline, Australian ship
