= Roden Cutler =

Australian Army officer, politician and diplomat

Sir Roden Cutler VC, AK, KCMG, KCVO, CBE
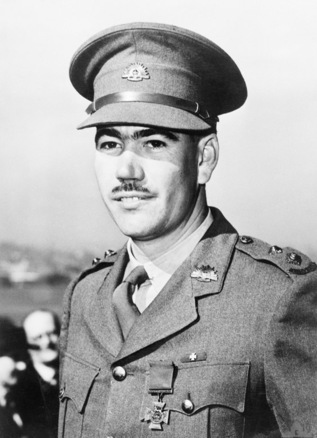

32nd Governor of New South Wales
- In office 20 January 1966 – 19 January 1981
- Monarch: Elizabeth II
- Premier: Sir Robert Askin (1966–75); Tom Lewis (1975–76); Sir Eric Willis (1976); Neville Wran (1976–81)
- Lieutenant: Sir Kenneth Street (1966–72); Sir Leslie Herron (1972–73); Sir John Kerr (1972–74); Sir Laurence Street (1974–81)
- Preceded by: Sir Eric Woodward
- Succeeded by: Sir James Rowland

Personal details
- Born: 24 May 1916 Manly, New South Wales, Australia
- Died: 21 February 2002 (aged 85) Sydney, New South Wales, Australia
- Spouse(s): Helen, Lady Cutler (1946–90); Joan, Lady Cutler (1993–02)

Military service
- Allegiance: Australia
- Branch/service: Australian Army
- Years of service: 1936–42
- Rank: Lieutenant
- Unit: Sydney University Regiment (1936–40); 2/5th Field Regiment (1940–42)
- Battles/wars: Second World War; Syria-Lebanon campaign; Battle of Merdjayoun; Battle of Damour
- Awards: Victoria Cross

Sir Arthur Roden Cutler, VC, AK, KCMG, KCVO, CBE (24 May 1916 – 21 February 2002) was an Australian diplomat, the longest-serving Governor of New South Wales and a recipient of the Victoria Cross, the highest award for gallantry "in the face of the enemy" that can be awarded to British and Commonwealth armed forces.

== Early life and education ==
Arthur Roden Cutler was born in the Sydney Harbour suburb of Manly, New South Wales on 24 May 1916. His cousin, Sir Charles Cutler, served as Deputy Premier of New South Wales from 1965 to 1975.

Arthur attended Manly Village Public School. At the age of 15, he enrolled at Sydney Boys High School. After school, he worked for the Texas Company Australasia, which later became Texaco.

He studied economics during the night at the University of Sydney and joined the Sydney University Regiment in 1936.

On 10 November 1939, Cutler was commissioned as a lieutenant in the Sydney University Regiment. He enjoyed all sports, especially riding, rifle shooting and water polo, and was awarded a University Blue in swimming. As an 18-year-old lifesaver, he swam to the aid of a surfer who was being circled by a large shark. The shark brushed him twice as he helped the surfer to the beach.

In May 1940, Cutler volunteered for overseas service with the Second Australian Imperial Force, receiving a commission in the 2/5th Field Regiment, Royal Australian Artillery, 7th Division.

== Military service ==
In 1941, Cutler served with the 2/5th in the Syria-Lebanon Campaign. During the period between 19 June and 6 July, in the Merdjayoun-Damour area of Syria, and as part of the Battle of Merdjayoun, Lieutenant Cutler's exploits included repairing a telephone line under heavy fire, repulsing enemy tank attacks, setting up an outpost to bring fire to a road used by the enemy and, with a 25-pound field gun, demolishing a post threatening the Australian advance. Later, during the Battle of Damour, he was seriously wounded and, when rescued 26 hours later, his leg had to be amputated. Cutler received the Victoria Cross for his actions in the Merdjayoun-Damour area, and was medically discharged in 1942.

=== VC citation ===
War Office, 28 November 1941.

The KING has been graciously pleased to approve the award of the VICTORIA CROSS to the under-mentioned:—

Lieutenant Arthur Roden Cutler (NX.12378), Australian Military Forces.

For most conspicuous and sustained gallantry during the Syrian Campaign and for outstanding bravery during the bitter fighting at Merdjayoun when this artillery officer became a byword amongst the forward troops with whom he worked.

At Merdjayoun on the 19 June 1941 our infantry attack was checked after suffering heavy casualties from an enemy counter attack with tanks. Enemy machine gun fire swept the ground but Lieutenant Cutler with another artillery officer and a small party pushed on ahead of the infantry and established an outpost in a house. The telephone line was cut and he went out and mended this line under machine gun fire and returned to the house, from which enemy posts and a battery were successfully engaged.

The enemy then attacked this outpost with infantry and tanks, killing the Bren gunner and mortally wounding the other officer. Lieutenant Cutler and another manned the anti-tank rifle and Bren gun and fought back driving the enemy infantry away. The tanks continued the attack, but under constant fire from the anti-tank rifle and Bren gun eventually withdrew. Lieutenant Cutler then personally supervised the evacuation of the wounded members of his party. Undaunted he pressed for a further advance. He had been ordered to establish an outpost from which he could register the only road by which the enemy transport could enter the town. With a small party of volunteers he pressed on until finally with one other he succeeded in establishing an outpost right in the town, which was occupied by the Foreign Legion, despite enemy machine gun fire which prevented our infantry from advancing.

At this time Lieutenant Cutler knew the enemy were massing on his left for a counter attack and that he was in danger of being cut off. Nevertheless he carried out his task of registering the battery on the road and engaging enemy posts. The enemy counter attacked with infantry and tanks and he was cut off. He was forced to go to ground, but after dark succeeded in making his way through the enemy lines. His work in registering the only road by which enemy transport could enter the town was of vital importance and a big factor in the enemy's subsequent retreat.

On the night of 23–24 June he was in charge of a 25-pounder sent forward into our forward defended localities to silence an enemy anti-tank gun and post which had held up our attack. This he did and next morning the recapture of Merdjayoun was completed.

Later at Damour on 6 July when our forward infantry were pinned to the ground by heavy hostile machine gun fire Lieutenant Cutler, regardless of all danger, went to bring a line to his outpost when he was seriously wounded. Twenty-six hours elapsed before it was possible to rescue this officer, whose wound by this time had become septic necessitating the amputation of his leg.

Throughout the Campaign this officer's courage was unparalleled and his work was a big factor in the recapture of Merdjayoun. London Gazette

== Diplomatic and vice-regal career ==
Following the war, Cutler began a long career in the Australian diplomatic service. At the age of 29 he was appointed High Commissioner to New Zealand (1946–52). Other postings within the Commonwealth followed; he served in Ceylon (now Sri Lanka) (1952–55) and was the Australian Minister in Egypt during the Suez Crisis in 1956. As a result of his service in Egypt, Cutler was appointed Commander of the Order of the British Empire (CBE) in the 1957 New Years Honours.

Cutler acted as Secretary-General of the South-East Asia Council of Ministers meeting in Canberra in January 1957 and became Chief of Protocol of the Department of External Affairs (1957–58). Cutler was also State President of the Returned Services League in 1958. He was Australian High Commissioner in Pakistan, (1958–61), and Australian Consul-General in New York, (1961–65), during which period he was the Australian delegate to the United Nations General Assembly in 1962, 1963 and 1964 and was the Australian Representative to independence of the Republic of Somalia in 1960.

For his diplomatic services to Australia, Cutler was honoured by The Queen as a Knight Commander of the Order of St Michael and St George (KCMG) in December 1965. He was further honoured as a Knight Commander of the Royal Victorian Order (KCVO) in 1970. He was appointed a Knight of the Order of Australia (AK) in 1981.

His final diplomatic posting, in 1965, as Ambassador to the Netherlands, was cut short in 1966 when he returned home as Governor of New South Wales, an office he served for a record 15 years, through four Premiers, and a change of government after eleven years of conservative rule. Such was his popularity that the Labor Premier, Neville Wran, extended his last term until 1981.

As the longest-serving state governor, Cutler occasionally acted as Administrator of the Commonwealth of Australia in the absence of the Governor-General. He acted as Administrator during Sir John Kerr's term from 20 February – 13 March 1975, 12–24 May 1975, 16–17 September 1975, 23 December 1975 – 3 February 1976, 26 April – 14 June 1977 and finally 23–28 August 1977. Cutler was also scheduled to act during November 1975, when Kerr had planned an overseas holiday. However, in view of the developing situation in Canberra, Kerr cancelled his travel bookings. In 1975, Cutler's advice to Kerr that he should warn Prime Minister Gough Whitlam of his impending dismissal, was ignored. Cutler later said that, had he been Administrator at the time, he would certainly have accepted his prime minister's advice and he would have allowed the parliament to resolve the issue without recourse to any such drastic action as dismissal.

== Later life ==
Grave of Sir Roden and Lady Cutler

Following the end of his term as governor, Cutler was given various chairmanships and business appointments, including as chairman of Ansett Express (1981–92) and the State Bank of New South Wales (1981–86). Throughout the republican debate and referendum he remained a staunch monarchist and proud Australian, believing the monarchy brought stability, continuity and tradition to his country. He co-operated with the popular Australian novelist Colleen McCullough on a biography, Roden Cutler, V.C., which appeared in 1998.

Cutler died on 22 February 2002 following a long illness. He was accorded the rare honour of a State Funeral on 28 February 2002 by the New South Wales Government.

== Personal life ==
Cutler married Helen Morris on 28 May 1946. They had four sons. She died on 8 November 1990 at St Vincent's Hospital.

Cutler remarried in 1993 to Joan Goodwin.

== Legacy ==
In 1968, the first in a new class of Sydney Harbour ferries was named the Lady Cutler.

A 19-storey commercial/office building completed in 1975 at 24 Campbell Street, Sydney, was named in his honour.

The highway interchange between three motorways at Casula in south-west Sydney is named in his honour as the Sir Roden Cutler VC Memorial Interchange.

=== Sir Roden & Lady Cutler Foundation ===
The Sir Roden & Lady Cutler Foundation helps the elderly and physically handicapped to be mobile and also with transport to and from their medical appointments. Many people have contributed to this cause, notably Cutler's former high school, Sydney Boys High, and his primary school, Manly Village, which also dedicated memorials to Cutler on the 90th anniversary of his birth.

== Honours ==
Victoria Cross (VC)	(1941)
Knight of the Order of Australia (AK)	(1981)
Knight Commander of the Order of St Michael and St George (KCMG)	(1965)
Knight Commander of the Royal Victorian Order (KCVO)	(1970)
Commander of the Order of the British Empire (CBE)	(1957)
Knight of Justice of the Venerable Order of St John of Jerusalem (KStJ)	(1965)
1939–45 Star	
Africa Star	
Defence Medal	
War Medal 1939–1945	
Australia Service Medal 1939–45	
Queen Elizabeth II Coronation Medal	(1953)
Queen Elizabeth II Silver Jubilee Medal	(1977)
Queen Elizabeth II Golden Jubilee Medal	(2002)

Appointments

- Honorary Fellow of the Institute of Chartered Accountants of Australia (Hon.FCA).

Honorary degrees

- (New South Wales) 1967: Honorary Doctor of Laws (Hon.LLD), University of Sydney.
- 1967: Honorary Doctor of Science (Hon.DSc), University of New South Wales and Newcastle (NSW).
- (New South Wales) 19 June 1981: Honorary Doctor of Letters (Hon.DLitt), University of New England.
- (New South Wales) 1985: Honorary Doctor of Letters (Hon.DLitt), University of Wollongong.

Honorary military appointments

- 22 August 1966 – 12 March 1985: Honorary Colonel of the Royal New South Wales Regiment.
- (New South Wales) 12 September 1966 – 12 March 1985: Honorary Colonel of the Sydney University Regiment.
- 20 January 1966 – 8 July 1981: Honorary Air Commodore of No. 22 Squadron, Royal Australian Air Force.

Diplomatic posts
Preceded by Thomas d'Alton	Australian High Commissioner to New Zealand; 1946–1952	Succeeded by Sir Peter Heydon
Preceded by Alex Borthwick	Australian High Commissioner to Ceylon; 1952–1955	Succeeded by Allan Eastman
Preceded by Hugh McClure Smith	Australian Minister to Egypt; 1956–1957	Succeeded by John Quinn
Preceded by Walter Cawthorn	Australian High Commissioner to Pakistan; 1958–1961	Succeeded by Charles Kevin
Preceded by Josiah Francis	Australian Consul-General in New York; 1961–1965	Succeeded by Reginald Sholl
Preceded by Walter Crocker	Australian Ambassador to the Netherlands; 1965–1966	Succeeded by Colin Moodie
Government offices
Preceded by Sir Eric Woodward	Governor of New South Wales; 1966–1981	Succeeded by Sir James Rowland
