= MV Kooleen =

Dismantled Australian ferry

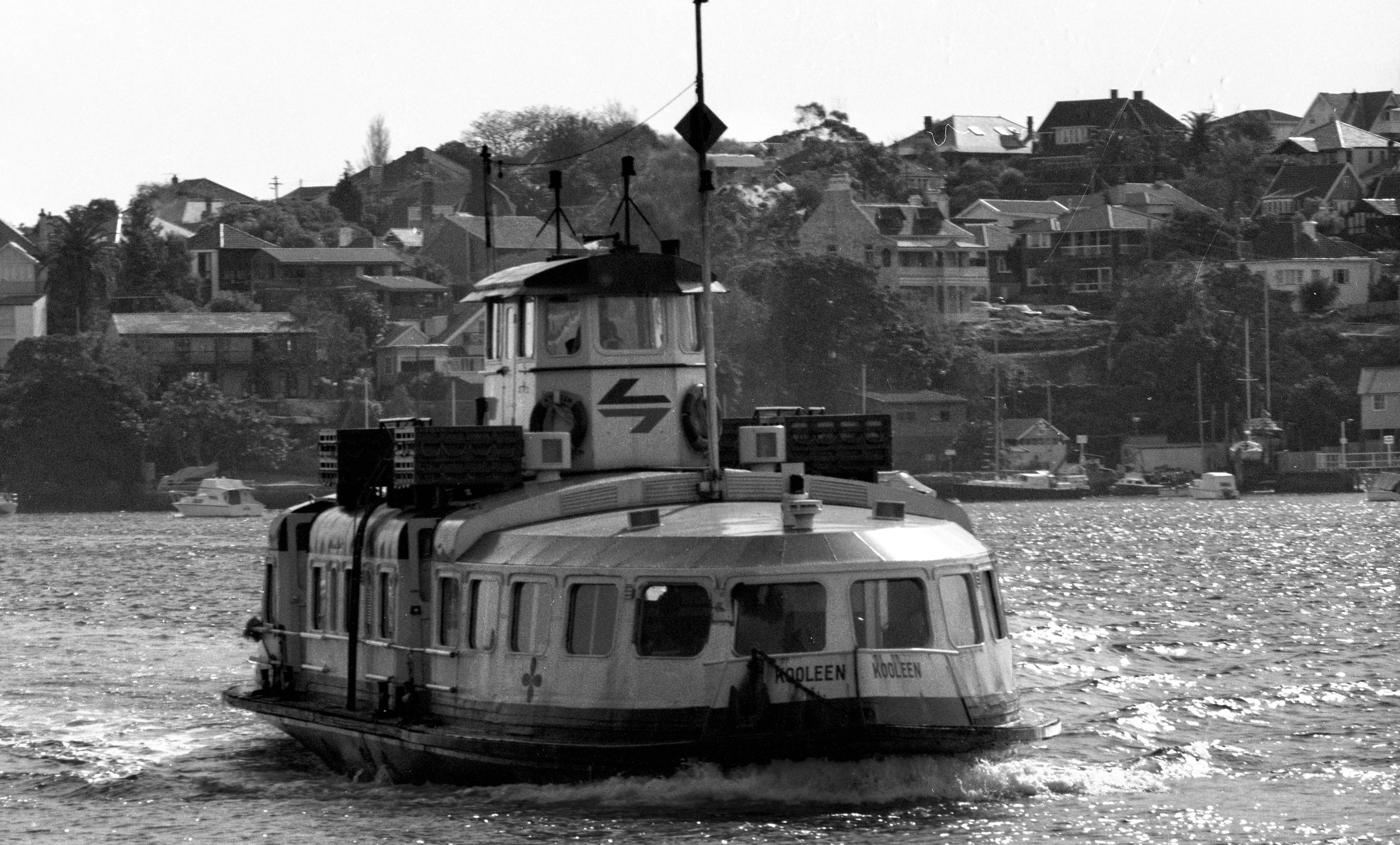
- Kooleen in 1983

History

Australia
- Name: Kooleen
- Operator: Sydney Harbour Transport Board; Public Transport Commission; Urban Transit Authority
- Port of registry: Sydney
- Builder: State Dockyard
- Launched: 1956
- Out of service: May 1985
- Fate: Scrapped

General characteristics
- Tonnage: 67 tonnes
- Decks: 1
- Installed power: Crossley
- Speed: 9 knots (17 km/h; 10 mph)
- Capacity: 278
- Crew: 3

MV Kooleen was a ferry operated by the Sydney Harbour Transport Board and its successors in Sydney Harbour.

== History ==
When the Sydney Harbour Transport Board took over the Sydney Ferries Limited business in July 1951, it inherited an old fleet in need of replacement. In 1954, an order was placed with the State Dockyard for a prototype new type of ferry. Delivered in 1956, the Kooleen was fully enclosed single-deck ferry with a high all-round view bridge. This was not popular with her passengers, who were used to double deck ferries with outdoor areas and thus no more were ordered. It would not be until the 1968 arrival of Lady Cutler that renewal of the fleet would commence.

The Kooleen remained in service until it was withdrawn in May 1985. In 1986 it was sold and converted to a houseboat. After sinking several times, it was sold in 2003 with the proposal of it being sunk as a dive vessel. However, this was not to eventuate, and after sinking again in Berrys Bay it was broken up on site in July 2006.
