= Tribal Warrior =

Tribal Warrior Association
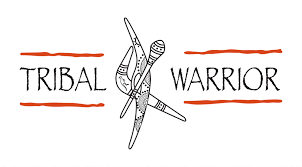
- Type: Non Government Organisation
- Tax ID no.: 30804052940
- Location: Redfern, New South Wales, Australia
- Coordinates: 33.8930376°S 151.25762110000005°E
- Services: Aboriginal support programs and Cruise Company
- Chairman & CEO: Shane Phillips
- Founding member: Uncle Max Eulo
- Website: www.tribalwarrior.org

Tribal Warrior is an Aboriginal Australian company based in Redfern, New South Wales.

== Activities ==
Tribal Warrior runs a mentoring program in partnership with Redfern Police to help reduce recidivism rates of Aboriginal Australian youth. The program is named "Clean Slate Without Prejudice" and uses ‘routine and discipline’ through boxing and fitness classes as a way of keeping vulnerable and at risk youth from being involved in criminal activity. In 2016, the program received a gold award in the police category of the Australian Crime and Violence Prevention Awards (ACVPA). The mentoring program initially started for young men, and later developed a women's program as well.

The organisation also runs an Aboriginal Cultural Cruise which allows visitors to Sydney to view the sights of Sydney Harbour and hear stories of the Eora, Cadigal, Guringai, Wangal, Gammeraigal and Wallumedegal people.

The organisation was founded in part to form an all Indigenous team to compete in the Sydney to Hobart race. Following a crowdfunding appeal, on Boxing Day, 2016, Tribal Warrior sailed the Southern Excellence Two in the event. The organisation missed the race's entry deadline due to a lack of funds, and was not part of the official race, but participated nonetheless.

== People ==
In 2013, CEO and Chairman Shane Phillips was awarded the Australian of the Year Local Hero Award recognising his work in the Redfern community. Phillips is a former player and current reserve coach for the Redfern All Blacks.

Mr Phillips is a current panel member of the Indigenous Advisory Committee for Westpac bank, helping to provide advice on Indigenous issues as they relate to the bank's business activities.

== Boats ==
The organisation operates the Tribal Warrior – a 15.4-metre gaff-rigged ketch. The sailboat was built more in 1899 in the Torres Strait and is used to train Indigenous skippers and maritime workers.

The organisation's vessel Mari Nawi (meaning 'big canoe' in the Eora language) is used for cruises and accommodates up to 150 guests with options for on board catering and entertainment.

In 2020, the NSW Government donated the retired Lady-class ferry Lady Northcott to Tribal Warrior. The vessel underwent works in Newcastle in order to put it back into survey. When the works were complete the vessel returned to Sydney Harbour under her own power on the 26th of September 2022. The vessel now has a second name Wirawi and is in active service for Tribal Warrior.

== Vessels ==
=== Tribal Warrior ===
Tribal Warrior
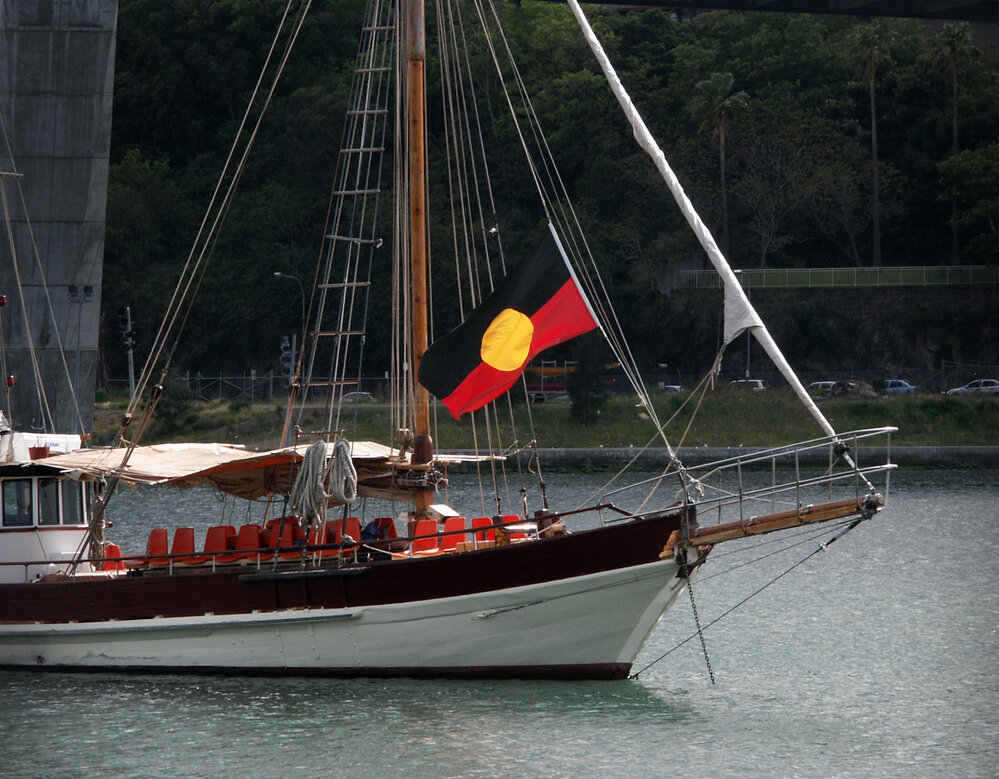
- Tribal Warrior in 2003
- Namesake: Tribal Warrior Aboriginal Corporation
- Launched: 1899 as Mina
- Status: Preserved by the Australian National Maritime Museum. Currently undergoing maintenance to operate once again.

Tribal Warrior was built in 1899 in at Port Kennedy on Thursday Island as Mina. It served as a pearl lugger originally. She was wrecked in 1933 but later recovered and restored. In 1942 she was given to the United States Military to be used during World War 2. By 1945 She was fitted with an auxiliary motor and by 1949 she was renamed San Nicola. In 1980, the Ganabarr Morning Star Clan took ownership of the vessel and renamed it Wutuku. In 1999 she was obtained by the Tribal Warrior Aboriginal Corporation and renamed Tribal Warrior. From 2001 to 2003, the vessel undertook a voyage around Australia. The vessel is currently berthed at Blackwattle Bay Marine undergoing maintenance.

=== Mari Nawi ===
Mari Nawi
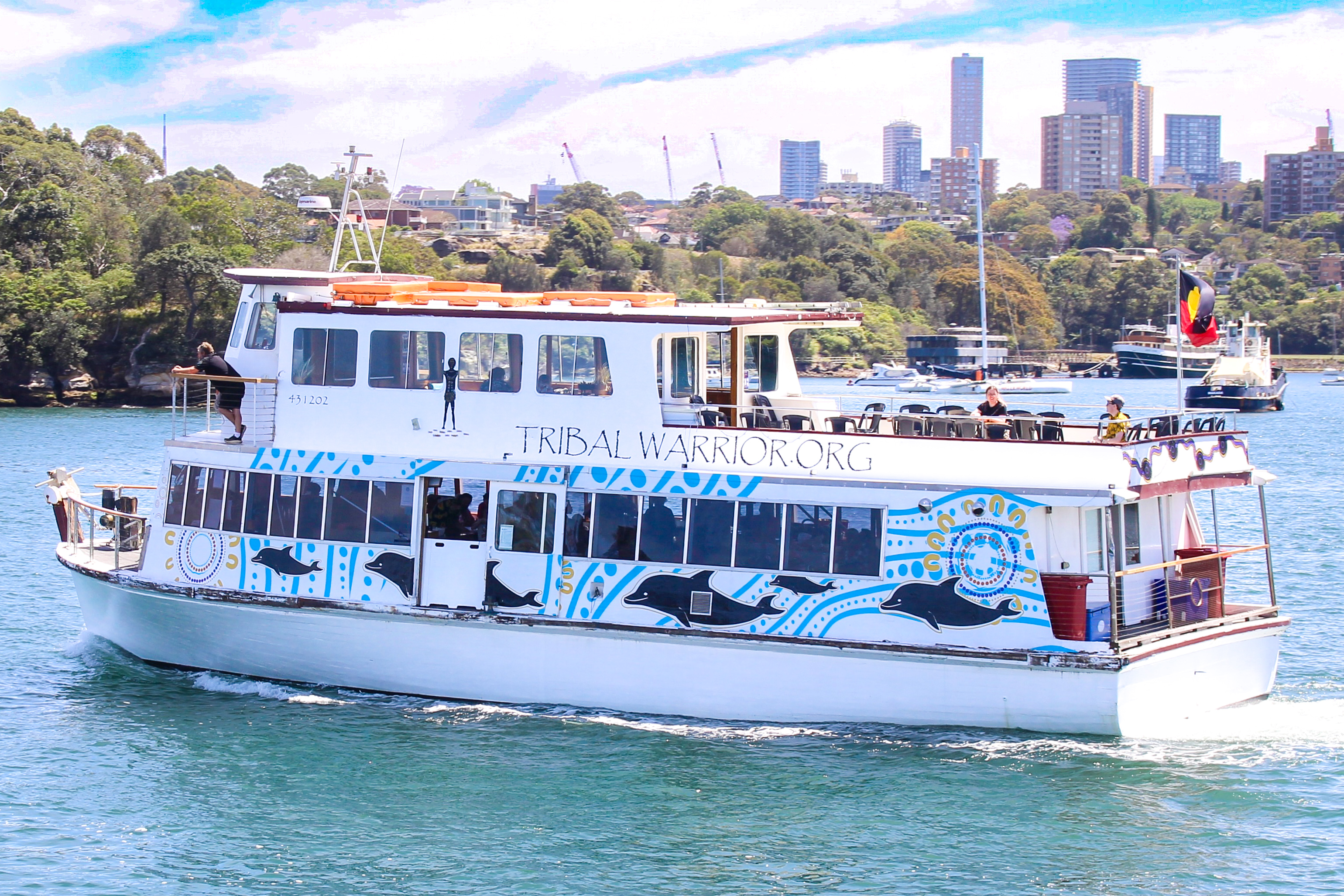
- Mari Nawi in 2024
- Namesake: 'big canoe' in the Eora language
- Launched: 1981 as MV Katika
- Status: Operational in service

Built in 1981 by H Morris Boatbuilder, Brisbane as MV Katika. the vessel served as a cruise vessel for various companies. At around 11:40pm on the 4 December 2010, Katika was on a cruise when, while berthing at Casino wharf, the vessel had a major mechanical failure. The vessel collided with a nearby sea wall and remained in ahead gear with the wheel still hard to starboard. Katika continued out of control to the other side of the channel and collided with Sydney Wharf Marina before becoming stuck against a dock. The wooden gunwale on the bow was completely destroyed by this incident.

After this incident, Tribal Warrior took ownership of the damaged Katika and renamed her to Mari Nawi which means "big canoe" in the Eora language. The company renovated the vessel and turned her into a cultural cruise boat and charter vessel. The damaged forward wooden bow gunwale was rebuilt as a metal railing and an outdoor stern section was built at the aft of the vessel. In 2023 the wooden panelling around the wheelhouse was also replaced with a railing like the one on the bow. Mari Nawi is used for Tribal Warrior's Cultural Cruises where participants are taken on a scenic tour of the harbour with a cultural commentary and performance. The vessel then travels to Goat Island (Me-Mel) where passengers are offloaded and taken on a cultural tour of the sacred Island. The vessel also does charter work along with event cruises for New Years and Vivid.

=== Lady Northcott / Wirawi ===
Lady Northcott Wirawi
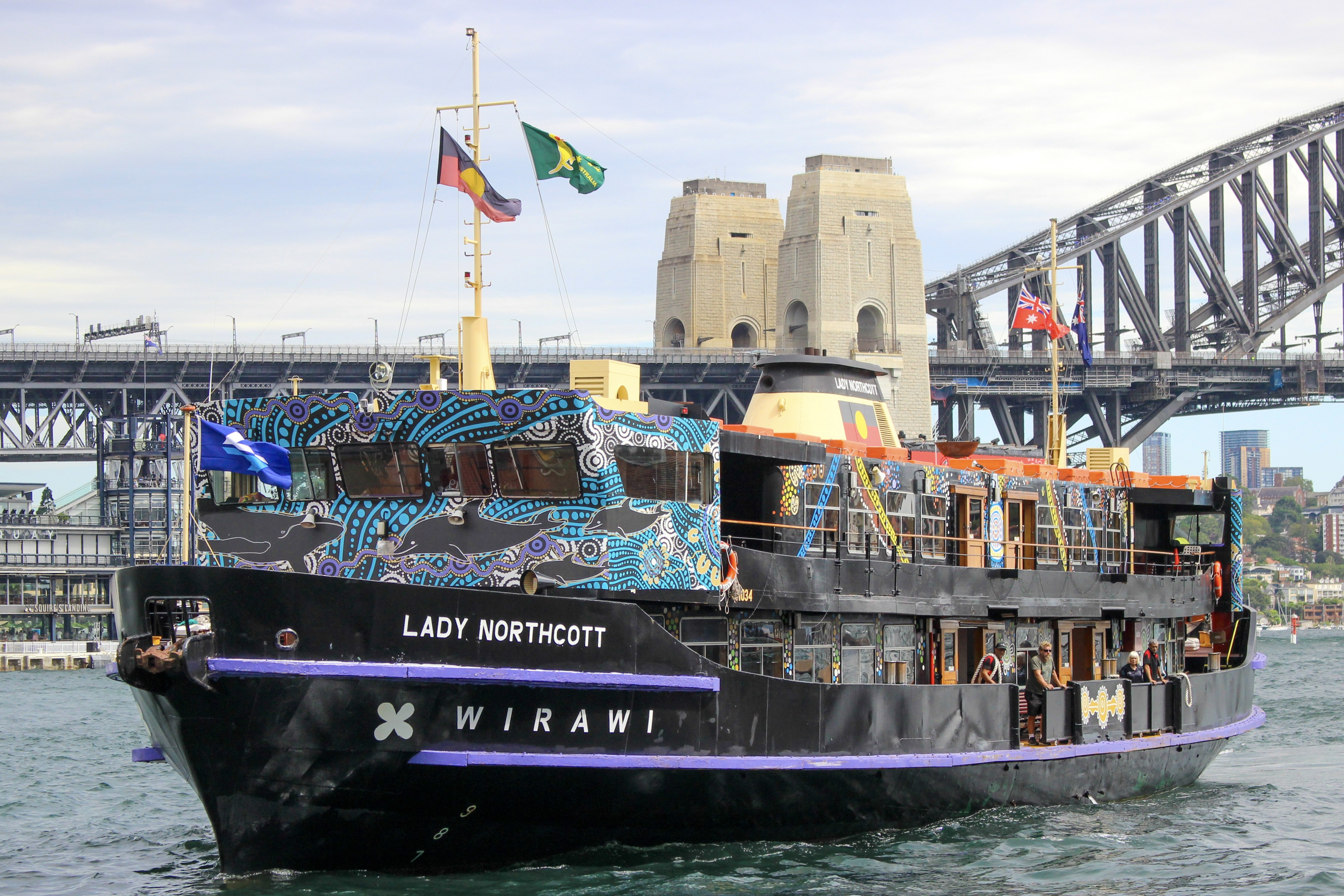
- Lady Wirawi Northcott on Australia Day 2024
- Namesake: 'Woman' in Dharug language (Wirawi); John Northcott (Lady Northcott)
- Builder: New South Wales State Dockyard, Newcastle
- Launched: 26 September 1974 as MV Lady Northcott
- Status: Operational in service

General characteristics
- Class & type: Lady-class ferry
- Displacement: 366 t (360 long tons; 403 short tons)
- Speed: 13 kn (24 km/h; 15 mph)
- Capacity: 811 (718 for Manly route)
- Notes: References:

In 1974, two enlarged versions of the Lady-class ferries were built by Carrington Slipways for the Sydney Harbour Transport Board, Lady Wakehurst and Lady Northcott. Lady Northcott operated on the Manly ferry service after South Steyne was damaged by a fire. Lady Northcott continued to operate with the Public Transport Commission and its successors on Manly and inner harbour runs for around 43 years, until she and her sister MV Lady Herron were withdrawn from service in 2017, both being the last of their class still in service. In 2020 after being laid up near Balmain Shipyard, Lady Northcott and Lady Herron were towed to Newcastle where they were stored side by side at Thales.

In 2021, Shane Phillips announced that the NSW Government had donated Lady Northcott to Tribal Warrior. Work was then undertaken to resurvey her for her return to Sydney. She was slipped at Thales and after around a year the vessel was ready for her return to Sydney. On 26 September 2022, sporting an Indigenous flag painted on her funnel by her skipper Terry Johnson (former skipper of her sister Lady Wakehurst), the vessel departed Newcastle in the morning before arriving back in Sydney later that evening. Work was then taken to convert her into a cruise vessel. Her green and cream paint job was replaced with a fully black paint job which features a lot of Indigenous artwork placed around the vessel.

Her first cruise was New Years 2022, where the vessel made a very successful debut. On 25 January 2023, the vessel undertook a relaunch ceremony, where she was given her second name "Wirawi" which means 'Woman' in Dharug language. She goes by both Lady Northcott and Wirawi, but it is usually referred to as "Lady Wirawi Northcott" by the crew. The interior of the vessel has been completely overhauled with a new galley, new red floor and new seating. She now sports removable seating to cater for different clients. She currently mainly operates as a charter vessel but will fill in on cultural cruises when Mari Nawi is unavailable on rare occasion. Wirawi also operates for public events such as Vivid, New Years and other harbour events. After Lady Herron was scrapped in early 2024, her engine and other components such as her horns were given to Tribal Warrior to be used as spare parts for Wirawi. On 26 September 2024 on her 50th anniversary, Wirawi was pulled by strongman Troy Conley-Magnusson for a charity event.

=== Deerubbun ===
Deerubbun
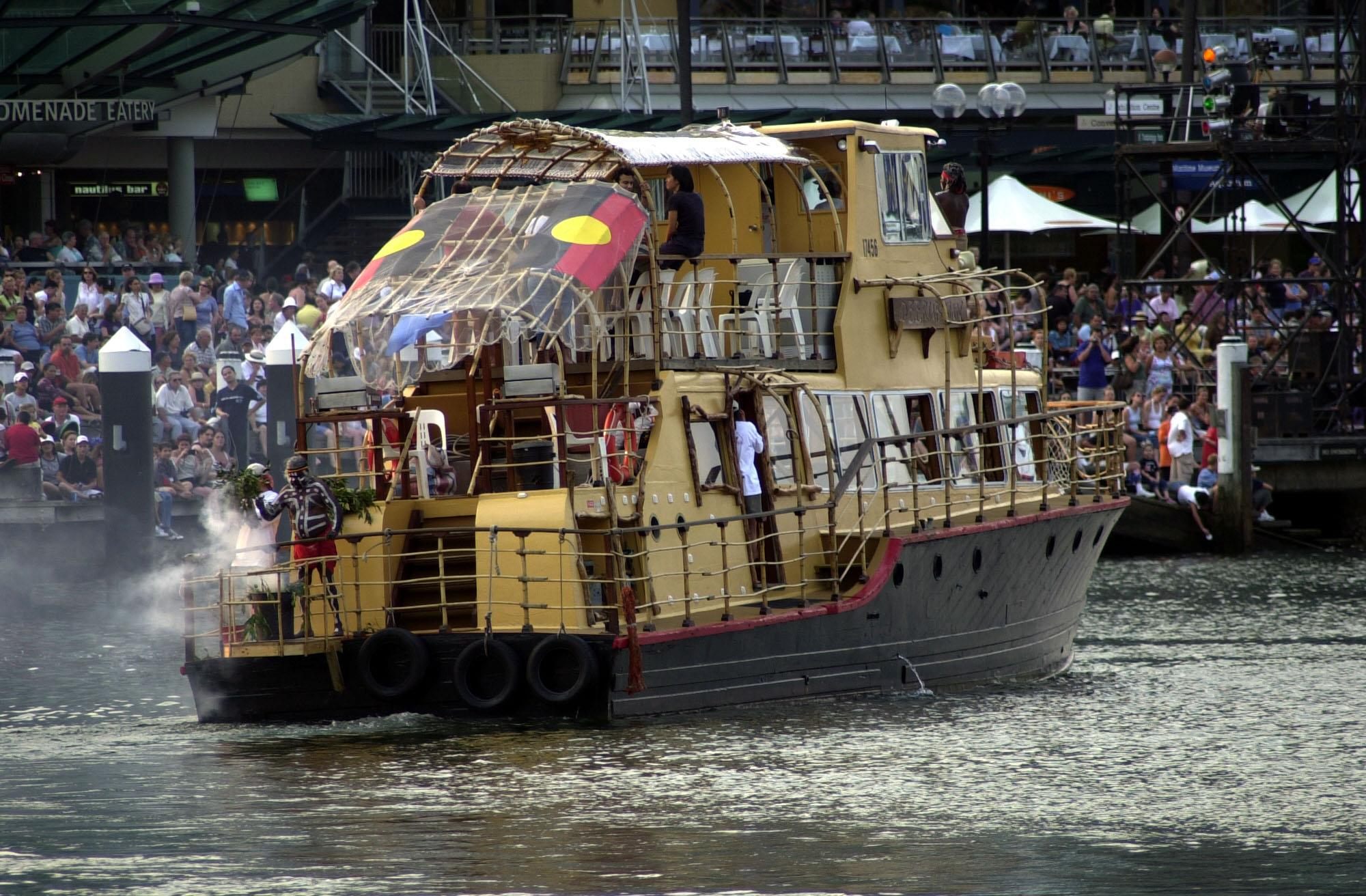
- Deerubbun at an unknown date.
- Namesake: Darug people's name for the Hawkesbury River
- Launched: Unknown (likely 1944–1945) as TRV 2
- Status: Landlocked and converted into a granny flat

A former World War 2 Torpedo Recovery Vessel, Deerubbun was Tribal Warrior's main vessel until the purchase of Mari Nawi. The vessel took on water and partially sank at its berth in 2011. The vessel was refloated and taken for repairs, but its keel broke during the process. The vessel was then sold to a landscaper in Western Sydney where it was converted into a granny flat.

=== Wandilla ===
Wandilla
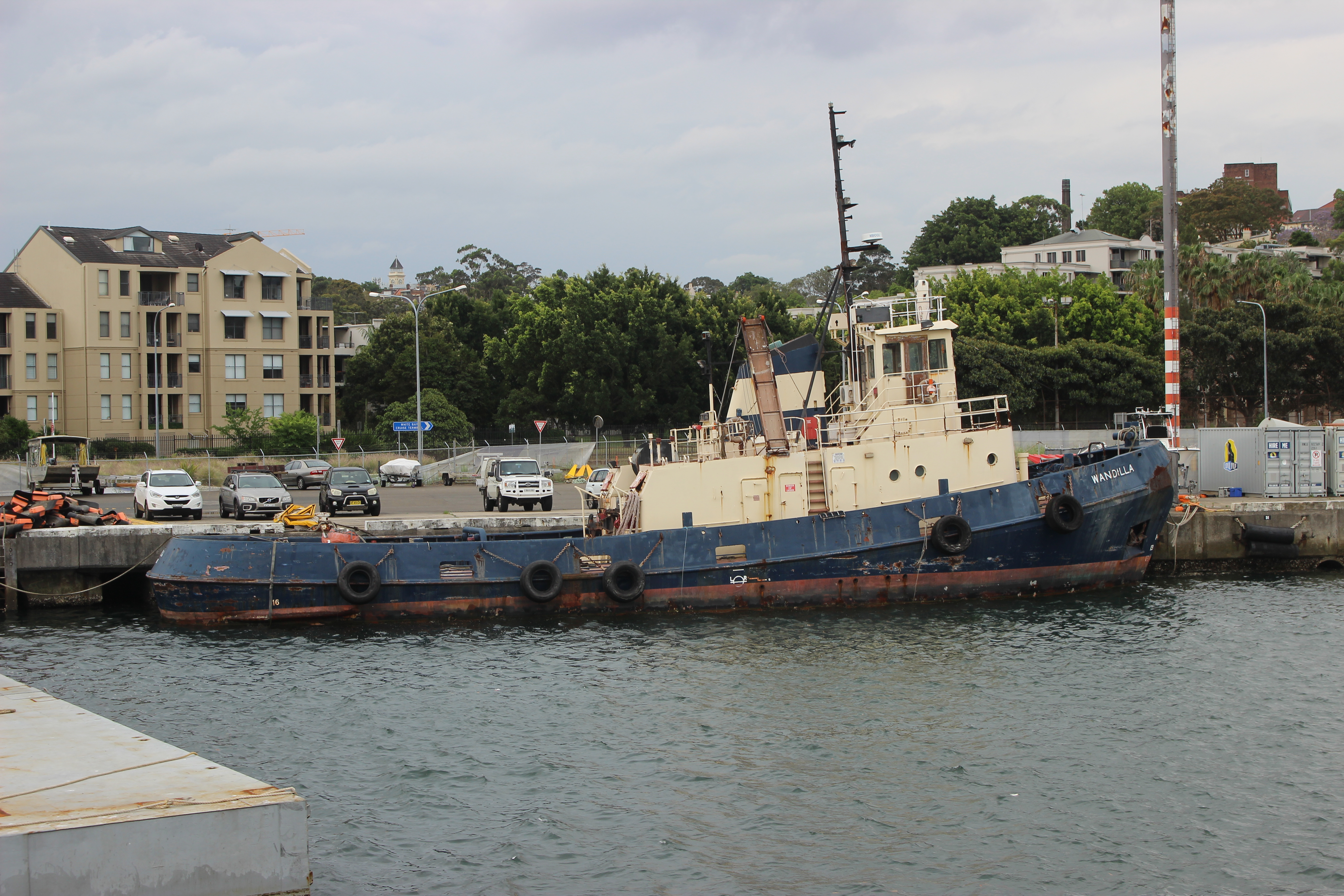
- Wandilla berthed in White Bay in November 2024
- Namesake: HMAT Wandilla
- Launched: 1970
- Status: Inactive

MV Wandilla served as a tugboat with Svitzer until it was donated to Tribal Warrior in 2013. The vessel was initially set to be used for training, but the vessel was not in ideal condition when acquired. Tribal Warrior has the vessel laid up at White Bay and it is likely that she will eventually be scrapped.

== See also ==
- The Block (Sydney)
