= Lady Edeline =

Sydney Harbour Ferry

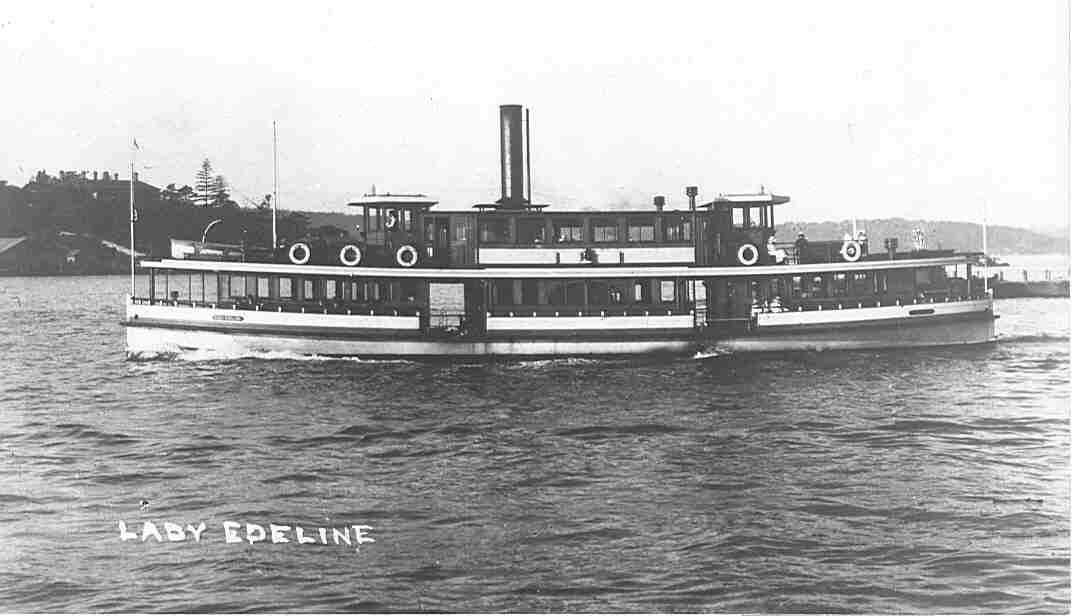
- As a steamer as built

History
- Name: Lady Edeline
- Namesake: Edeline Strickland
- Operator: Balmain New Ferry Company, Sydney Ferries Limited, Sydney Harbour Transport Board, Public Transport Commission, Urban Transit Authority
- Builder: G A Washington of Balmain
- Launched: 1913
- Out of service: laid up 1984/5
- Fate: Sunk 1988

General characteristics
- Tonnage: 96 tons
- Length: 33.7 m
- Propulsion: Steam (1914-1937), Diesel (from 1937)
- Speed: 11 knots as built, 9 knots as diesel
- Capacity: 544

Lady Edeline was a wooden Sydney Harbour ferry built in 1913 for the Balmain New Ferry Company. She and four similar ferries, Lady Chelmsford (1910), Lady Denman (1912), Lady Ferguson (1914), Lady Scott (1914) were a new series of "Lady-class", designed by naval architect, Walter Reeks.

Lady Edeline and her four sister ships continued to operate after the 1932 opening of the Sydney Harbour Bridge and were converted to diesel power that decade. They also survived the 1951 NSW State Government takeover of the ailing ferry fleet. She was taken out of service in 1984 following the sinking of fellow old wooden ferry, Karrabee earlier that year. She was laid up on the Parramatta River where she settled into the mud in 1988 and was broken up. Lady Edeline was the longest serving of the five sisters, and the last wooden ferry run by the government service.

Continuing a Balmain Ferry Co convention of naming their ferries after the wives of Governors-General of Australia and Governors of NSW, Lady Edeline was named after Lady Edeline Strickland, wife of New South Wales governor, Sir Gerald Strickland. This naming nomenclature was again used by the State Government harbour ferry operator with the introduction of 6 new "Lady-class ferries" in the 1960s and 1970s.

== Design and construction ==
In common with most Sydney Harbour ferries at the time, Lady Edeline and her four sisters were wooden double-ended screw steamers. The five ferries had only a single propeller at one end that pushed the vessels in one direction and pulled them in the other. This feature was introduced by the ferry's designer, Walter Reeks, on a previous Balmain company ferry, Lady Rawson of 1906. The configuration contrasted with the double-ended vessels of Sydney Ferries Limited (the K-class ferries) which had a continuous propeller shaft and a screw at each end. A single propeller and one shaft simplified the internal arrangements and put less stress on the timber hulls compared to shafts running a propeller at either end. Apart from some unusual handling characteristics, the single-propeller configuration was a success and Reeks unsuccessfully tried to patent it.

Lady Edeline was built by G A Washington of Balmain. Her sisters were by various builders; Lady Chelmsford (1910) was built by Brisbane Water shipbuilder Rock Davis, Lady Denman (1912) and Lady Scott (1914) were built by Joseph Dent of Jervis Bay and Lady Ferguson (1914) by David Drake of Balmain.

With construction of a Sydney Harbour Bridge seeming likely, she and her four sisters were designed for a maximum of fifteen years of life. Instead, the five would serve on the harbour for at least 60 years, with Lady Edeline operating until 1985. Because she was intended to have a limited life-span, she was lightly built and almost austere in her fittings, such as her roof of galvanised iron. The five were relatively small and had a veed shape and shallow draft to navigate the muddy and silted upper reaches of their upstream runs.

Lady Edeline's machinery was supplied by Pollock. The 28 hp steam compound steam engines could push her to 11 knots.

== Service history ==
From 1900, the Balmain New Ferry Company began a period of expansion to keep up and compete with the tram network expanding into what is now referred to as Sydney's Inner West. Older ferries were sold off including several series of "Lady-class" ferries were introduced.

Lady Edeline was the third of five in the Balmain company's final series of "Lady-class" ferries, the others being Ladies Chelmsford (1910), Denman (1912), Scott (1914), and Ferguson (1914). This series was introduced to replace the single-ended ferries on the Lane Cove River service. They also worked on the run from Balmain to Erskine Street wharf (at site of current Barangaroo).

Lady Edeline, and the rest of the Balmain fleet, were bought by Sydney Ferries Limited as part of its take over of the Balmain company on 1 March 1918. The five operated the Lane Cove River services to Fig Tree until 12 November 1931 when weekday services were suspended. They ran weekend services to Fig Tree on weekends until 2 September 1945. Lane Cove River services were discontinued altogether on 10 November 1950, after which the five saw them work the Parramatta River and across other routes. Sydney Ferries ran a service to Balmain until it was taken over in 1939 by Nicholson Brothers Harbour Transport Company with their own ferries. The five "Lady class" ferries were run on other routes across the harbour.

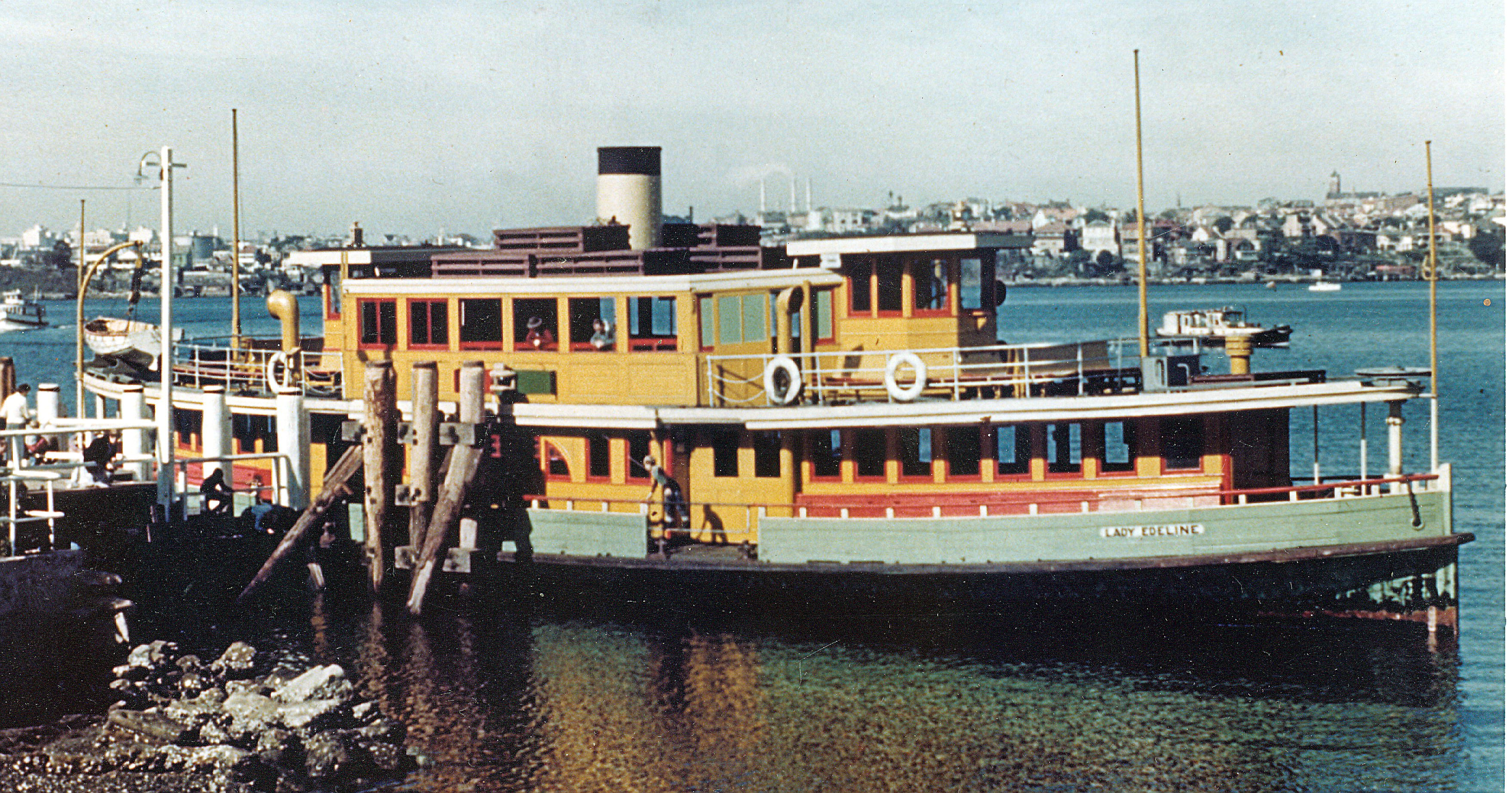
At Greenwich in the 1960s as a diesel in her 1936 colour scheme

In 1932, the Sydney Harbour Bridge was opened, and Sydney Ferries Limited's annual patronage dropped from 40 million to about 15 million. As part of economy measures, almost older and/or larger steamers were put up for sale, and the five "Lady-class" ferries were converted to diesel power in the 1930s with Lady Chelmsford first. Their tall black smoke stacks were replaced with short funnels. Facing uncertain times, Sydney Ferries Limited sought a refreshed look for their ferries, painting over the original livery of varnished timber and white trim with a scheme of yellow and green with a red trim. In 1936, Lady Edeline re-entered service with a six-cylinder 228 bhp Gardner diesel that pushed her to 10 knots. The five "Lady" ferries continued to run the Hunters Hill and Balmain services.

The post-Bridge drop in demand for the ferry fleet was somewhat mitigated as many could not afford their own transport in the Great Depression of the 1930s and rationing of fuel during World War 2 made the coal required for the steam ferries relatively cheap. However, the post World War II years saw the drop in demand pick up pace. In 1951, with annual patronage down to 9 million, the NSW State Government took over Sydney Ferries Limited and its remaining fleet and assets. The ferries became assets of the Sydney Harbour Transport Board and the Port Jackson & Manly Steamship Company, which ran the Manly service, was paid to run the services. The services and fleet were quickly rationalised with most of the larger remaining timber K-class steamers being decommissioned. The five relatively small and economical "Lady-class" ferries, however, were retained. Throughout the remainder of the 1950s and into the 1960s, they became the back-bone of Sydney Harbour's non-Manly ferry fleet, along with Karingal and Karrabee the smallest of the K-class ferries. Their routes were expanded to all inner-harbour (ie, non-Manly) services including Taronga Park Zoo, Milsons Point, Cremorne and Hunters Hill.

The five sister ferries (except Lady Scott) were re-engined again in the late 1950s and early 1960s. Lady Edeline's 1936 Gardner diesel was replaced by a 300 bhp 4-cylinder Crossley Brothers diesel in 1963. In the 1960s, the Board updated the 1930s green and gold livery to a more muted cream and khaki scheme. In 1974, the board became the Public Transport Commission (PTC) and a royal blue and white scheme was adopted for all the ferries. The PTC became the Urban Transit Authority of NSW in 1980 which ran the ferries until 1989, and the ferries, including Lady Edeline were painted white with navy blue trim.

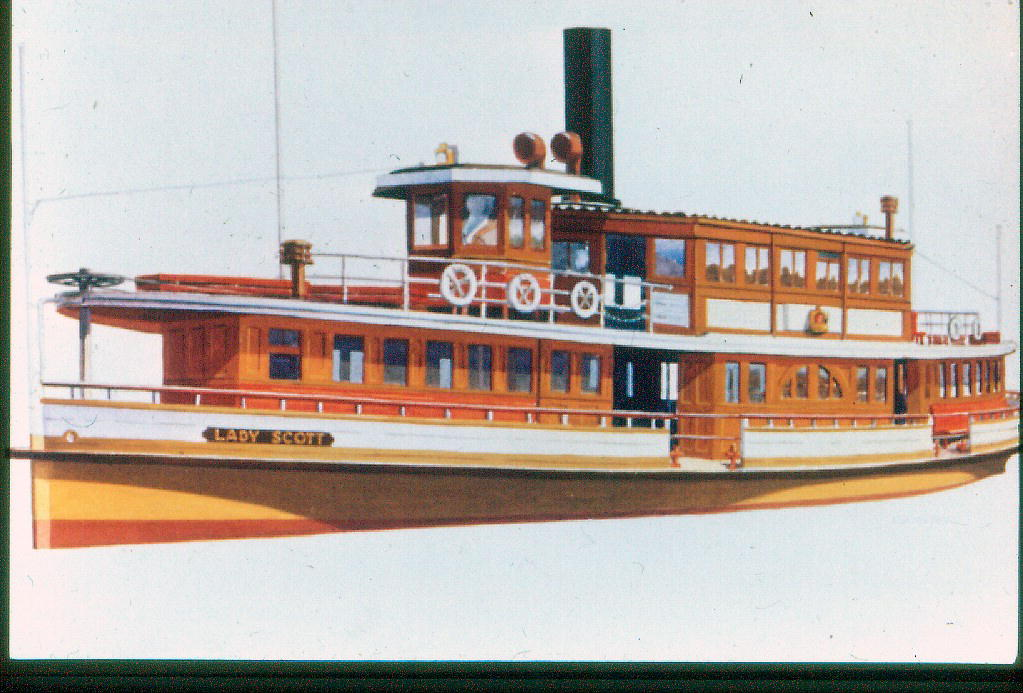
Colour illustration of Lady Scott showing the five "Lady class" ferrys' original livery including varnished timber and black funnels.

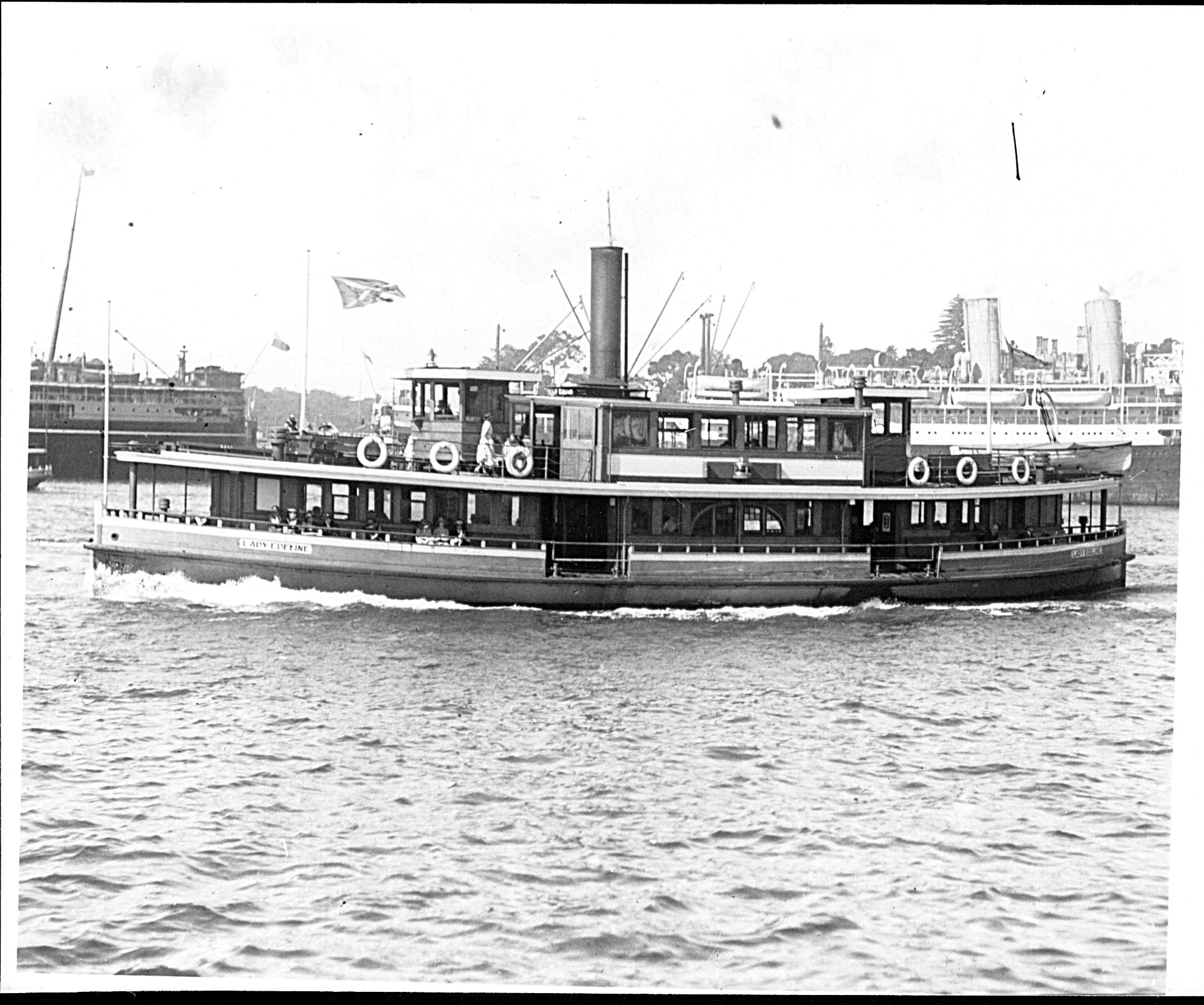
Lady Edeline leaves Sydney Cove in circa 1930

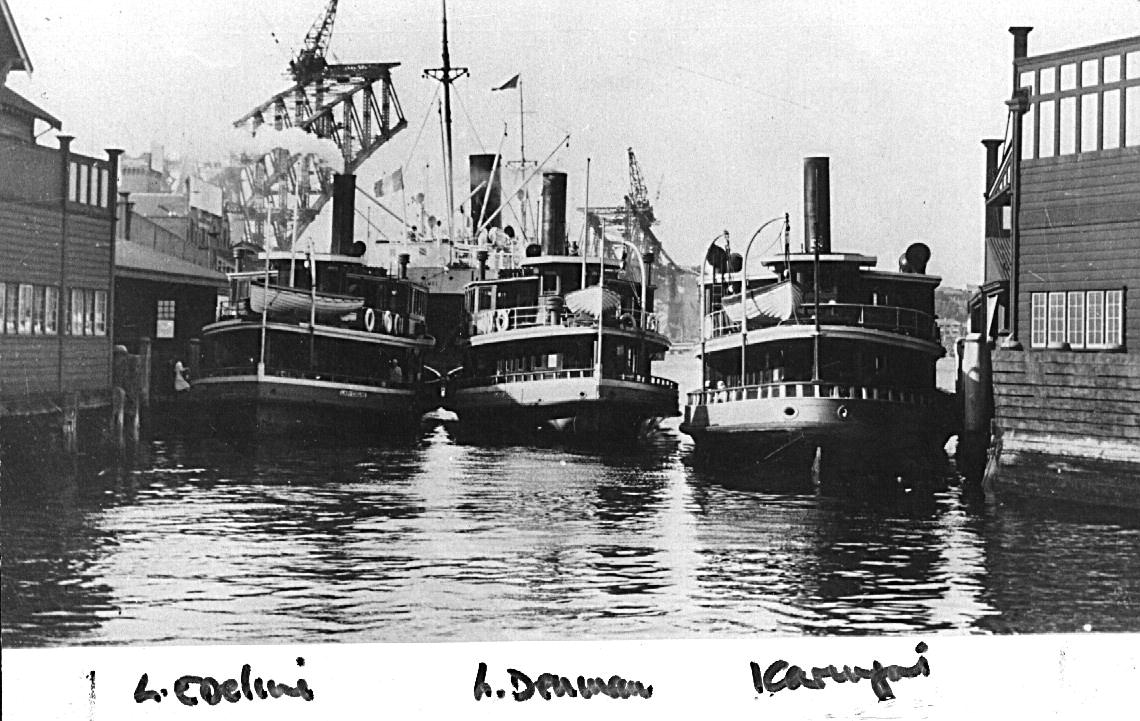
Lady Edeline (left), Lady Denman (middle) and Karingal (right) at Circular Quay with the Sydney Harbour Bridge under construction, 1930

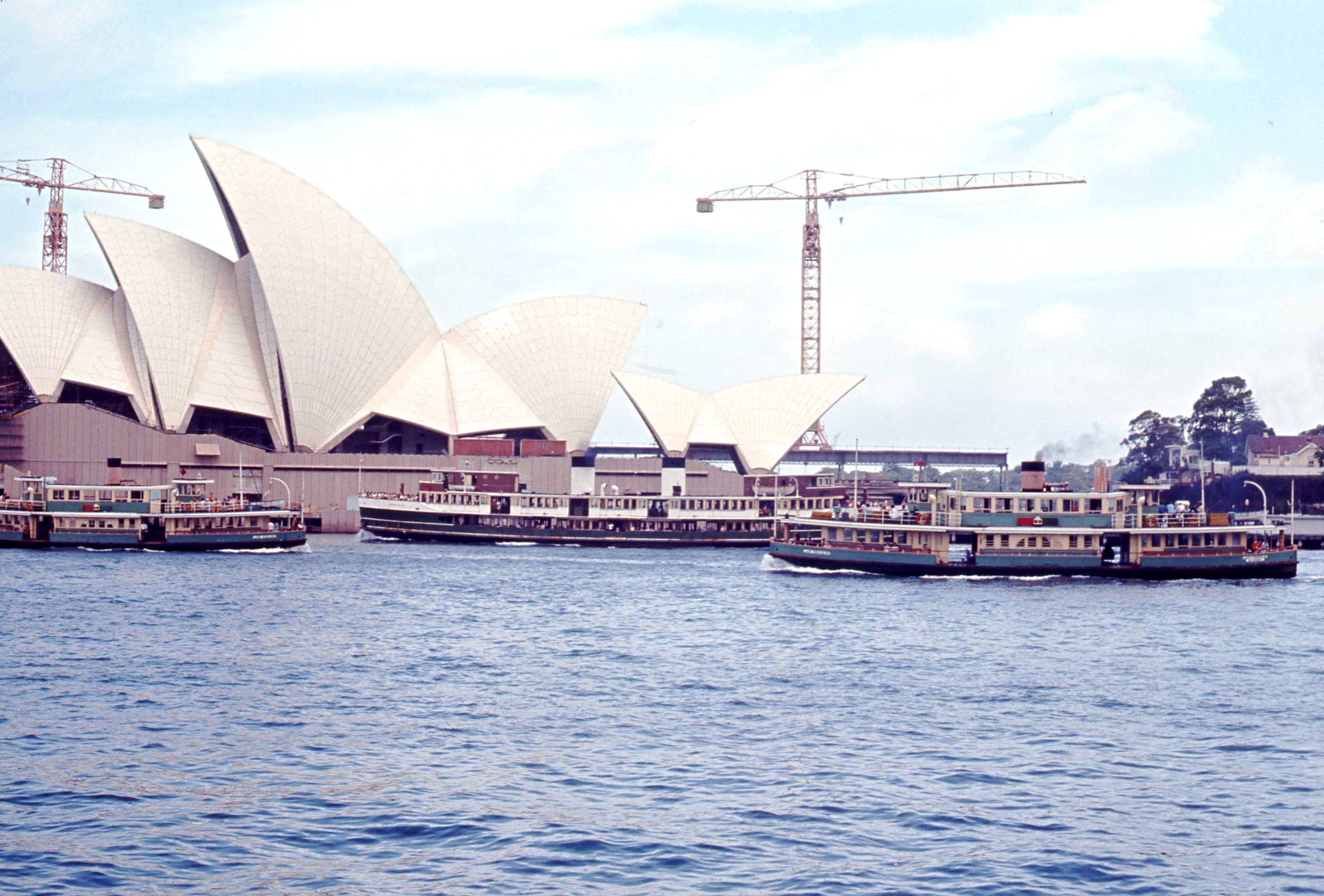
Lady Edeline, Manly ferry North Head, and Lady Ferguson in Sydney Cove with the Sydney Opera House under construction

The Lady Edeline appeared in the 1983 film, "Careful, He Might Hear You", in which it was sunk upon collision with a larger passenger ship.

== Demise ==
Lady Edeline became the longest serving of the five "Lady ferries" and came close to being the longest serving of any Sydney ferry. Lady Chelmsford, the first built of the five, was sold in 1969 and rebuilt as a show boat in Adelaide. She was sold to Melbourne interests in 1985 where she was used as a cruise boat. She sank at her moorings in 2008 and was broken up in 2011. By the 1970s, Lady Ferguson was being used as a spare ferry on Sydney Harbour. She was towed to Hobart with Kosciusko in 1975 to assist following the collapse of the Tasman Bridge however she was found to be in too poor condition and was scrapped. Lady Denman was pulled from ferry service in 1979 following the introduction that year of the new Lady Street. She is now on permanent land display at Huskisson on the New South Wales south coast and of the original five, is the only extant vessel.

Following the high-profile sinking of Karrabee in January 1984, the remaining wooden ferries, namely, Kameruka, Karingal and Lady Edeline, were removed from service later that year with Lady Edeline being the last. The same year, the first of nine First Fleet-class ferries were put into service. Lady Edeline was laid up on the Parramatta River near the Mortlake Punt. She sank into the mud in 1988 following heavy rain. Her superstructure was removed but her hull can be seen in low tide.

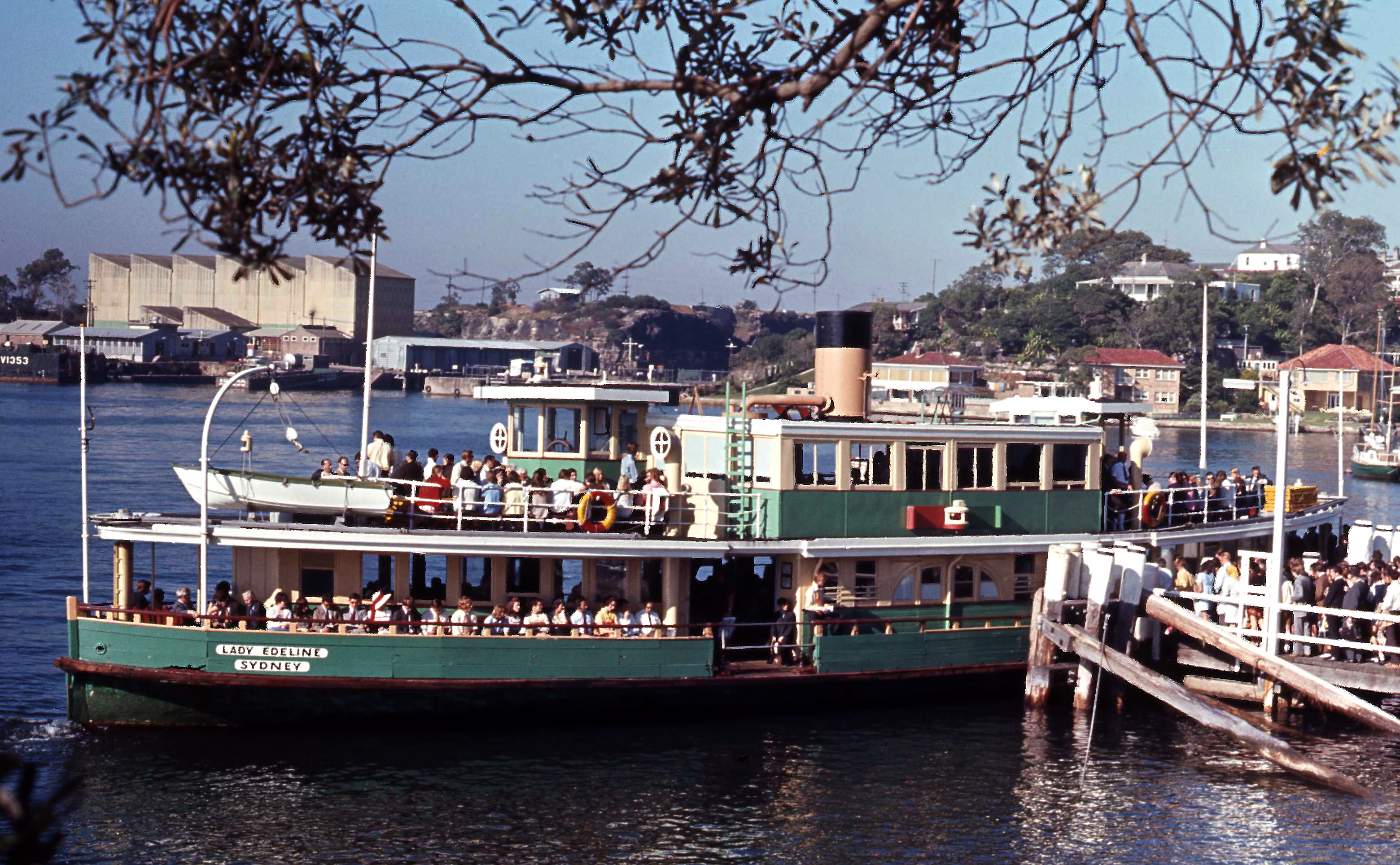
At Valentia St Wharf, Woolwich, November 1971

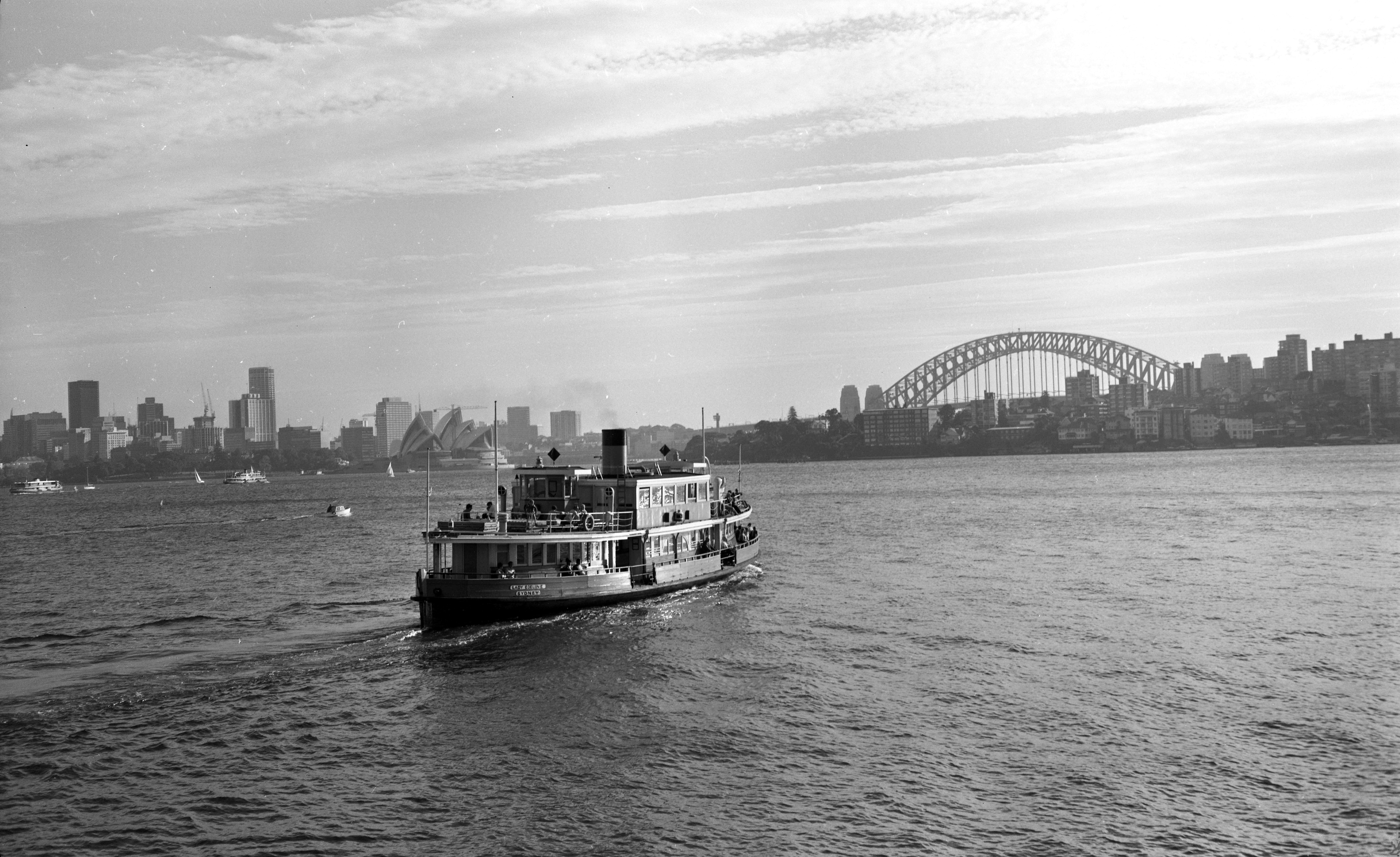
En route to Circular Quay from Cremorne Point, 1972

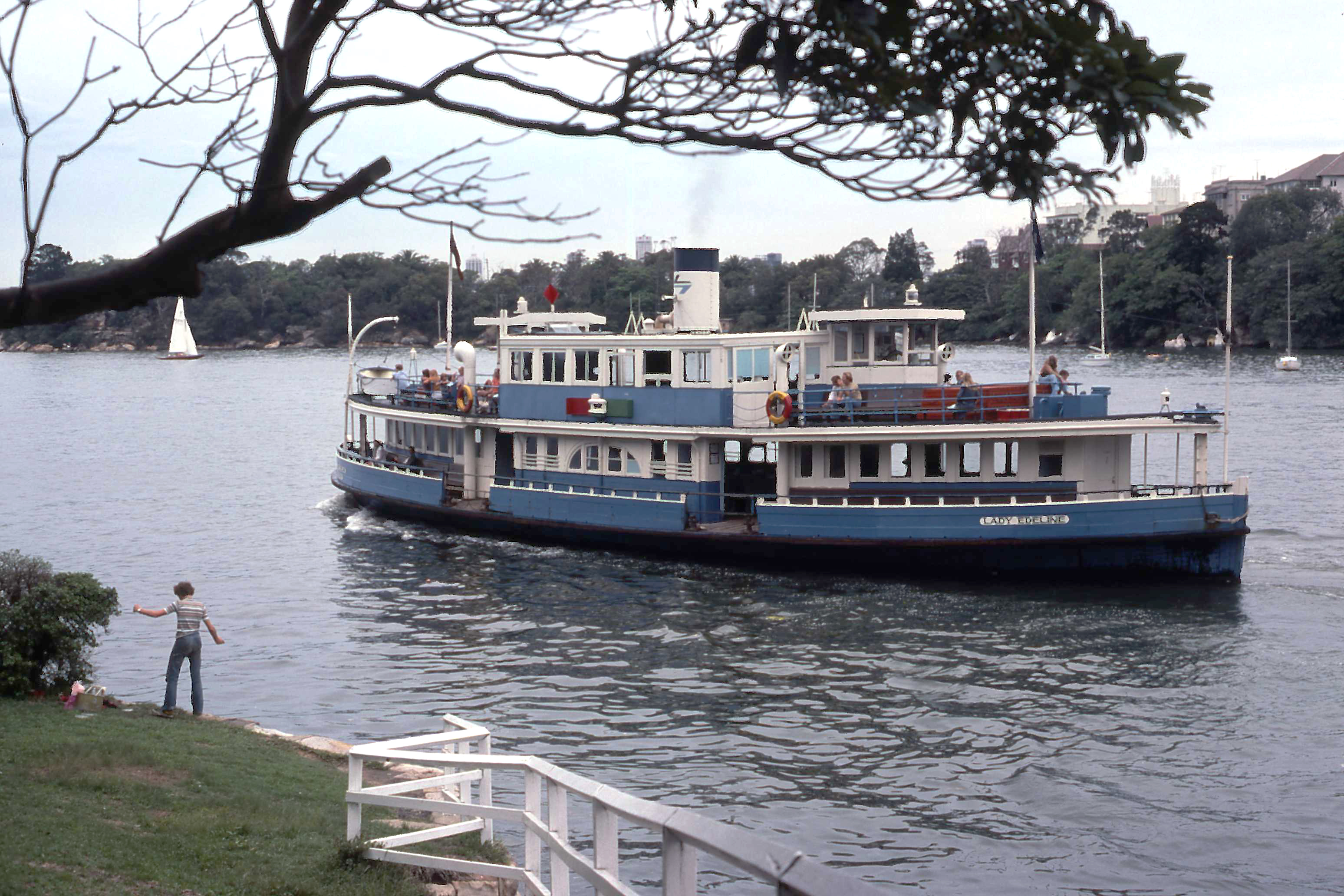
Leaving Musgrave Street Wharf (now Mosman South) in February 1978

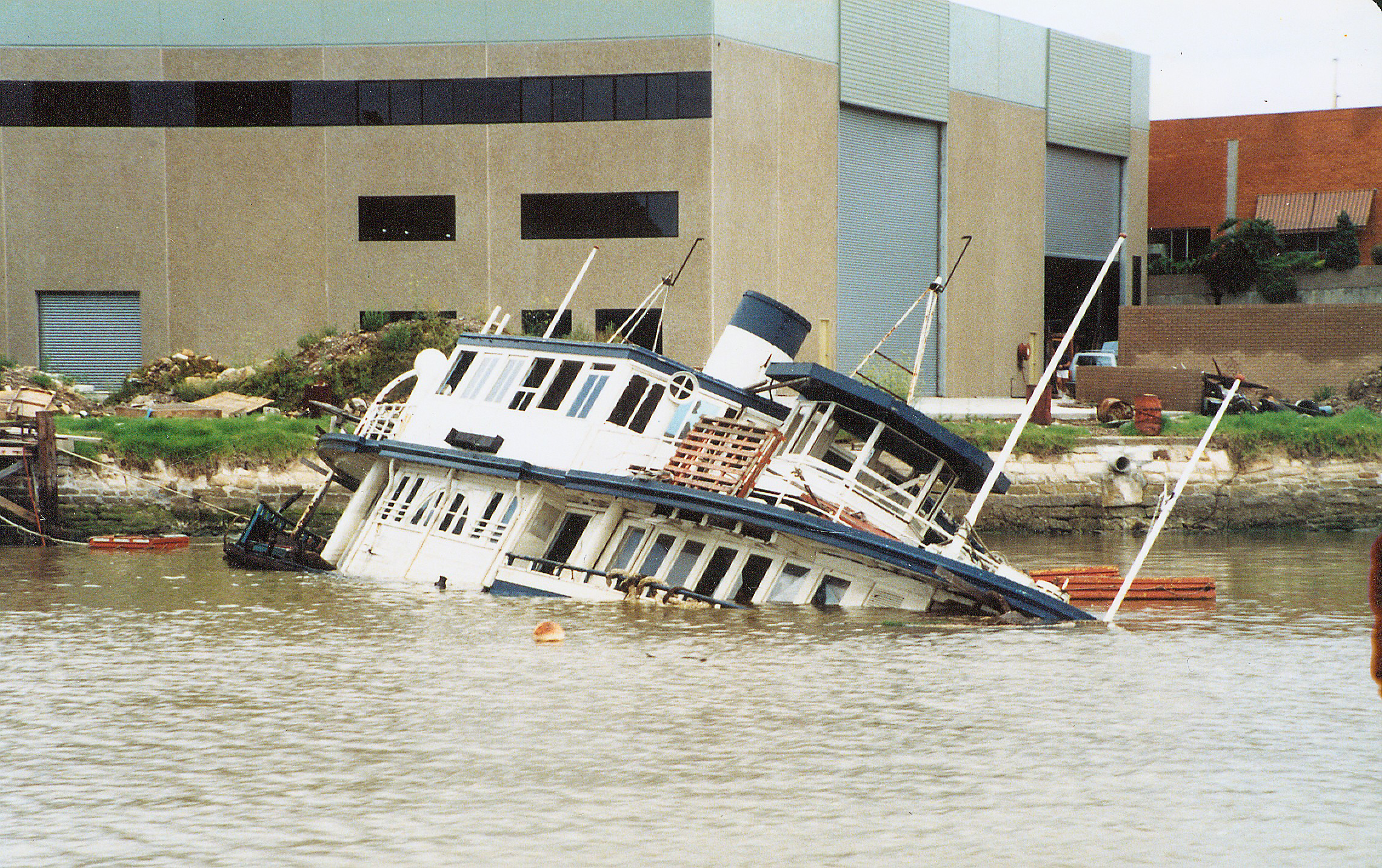
Sunk in the mud at Mortlake, 1988

== See also ==
- List of Sydney Harbour ferries
