= Roden Cutler House =

Skyscraper in Sydney, Australia

Coordinates: 33.878983°S 151.206669°E

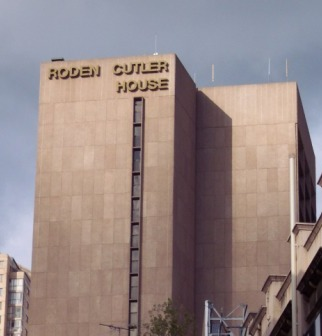
Roden Cutler House

Roden Cutler House is a skyscraper in Sydney, New South Wales, Australia. It consists of 19 floors primarily used as office or commercial spaces. Construction finished in 1975 and the building is located at 24 Campbell Street, Sydney. The structure height is 108m and the antenna height is 112m. The building is owned by Ausgrid and the lower floors house the City South substation.

The building is named after Sir Roden Cutler, the longest-serving Governor of New South Wales and a Victoria Cross recipient.
