= Lady Cutler =

Ferry

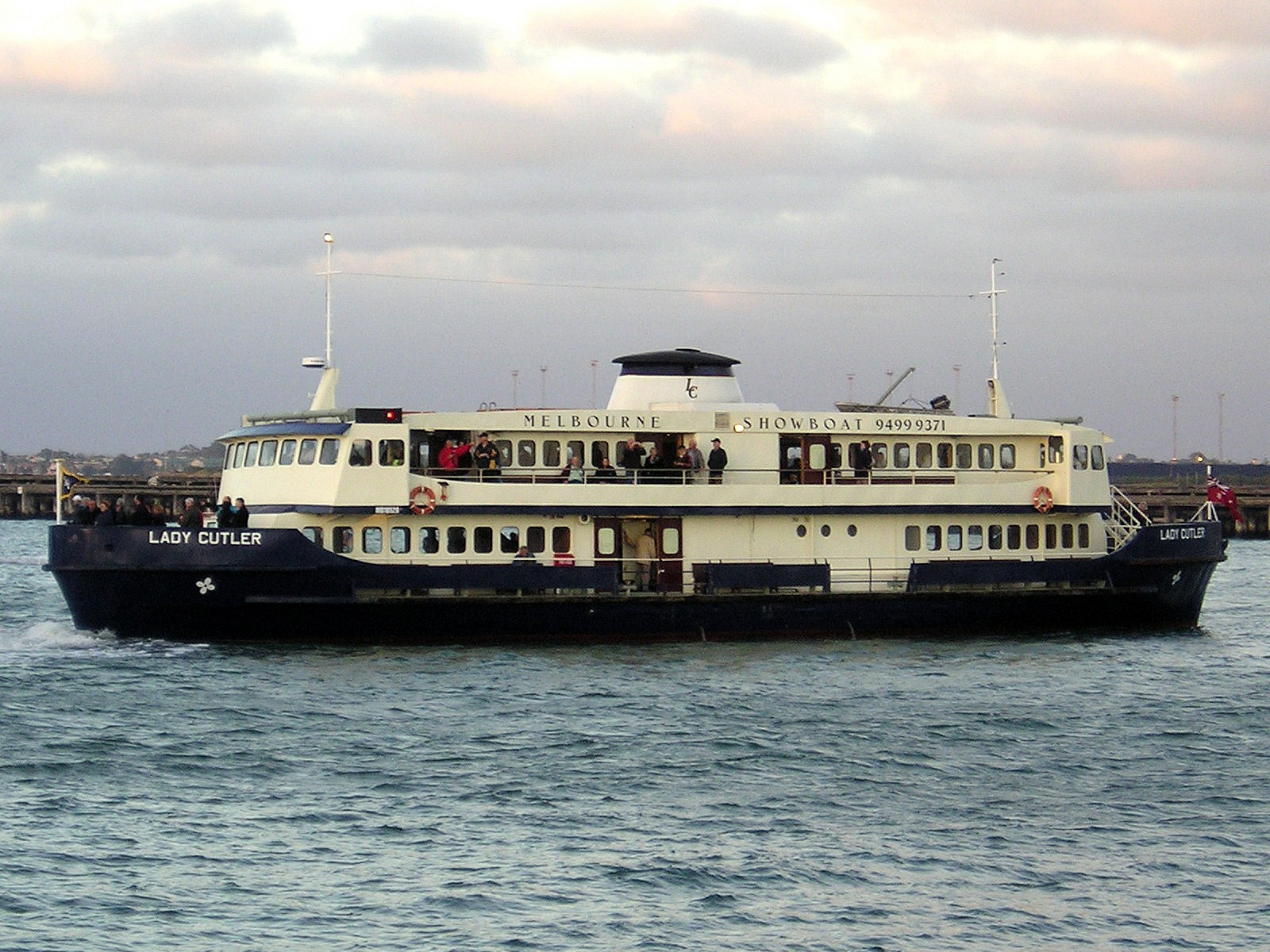
- Lady Cutler

History

Australia
- Name: Lady Cutler
- Owner: 1968-1974: Sydney Harbour Transport Board; 1974-1980: Public Transport Commission; 1980-1989: Urban Transit Authority; 1989-1991: State Transit Authority; 2007-present: Jeff Gordon (Huntly Gordon Investments Pty Ltd)
- Port of registry: 1968-1998: Sydney; 1998-present: Melbourne
- Route: Sydney Harbour ferry
- Builder: State Dockyard, Newcastle
- Yard number: 80
- Laid down: 1 March 1968
- Launched: 10 August 1968
- Commissioned: re-commissioned 13 January 2008 by Lady Joan Cutler
- In service: 1968
- Identification: IMO number: 6823442; MMSI Number: 503334800; Callsign: VKV7020

General characteristics
- Type: double-ended ferry, later excursion vessel
- Tonnage: 404 GRT
- Length: 38.66 m (126.8 ft)
- Beam: 9.3 m (31 ft)
- Depth: 2.1 m
- Installed power: MWM turbo diesel 8 cylinders 510bhp

MV Lady Cutler was a Lady-class ferry on Sydney Harbour services for 22 years. Retired from Sydney ferry service in 1991, she has since been refurbished and now operates tours on Port Phillip, Melbourne.

== Design and construction ==
MV Lady Cutler was the first of the Lady Class ferries built between 1968 and 1969 for the Sydney Harbour Transport Board to operate in Sydney Harbour. She was of double-ended design with a capacity for 590 passengers. With a length of 38.66 m (126.8 ft) and beam of 9.3 m (31 ft), her tonnage is 404 GRT. Lady Cutler is powered by an 8-cylinder MWM turbo diesel producing 510bhp and driving a single propeller at each end.

The ferry was launched on 10 August 1968 at the State Dockyard, Newcastle and named after Lady Helen Cutler, wife of the 32nd Governor of New South Wales, Roden Cutler.

== History ==
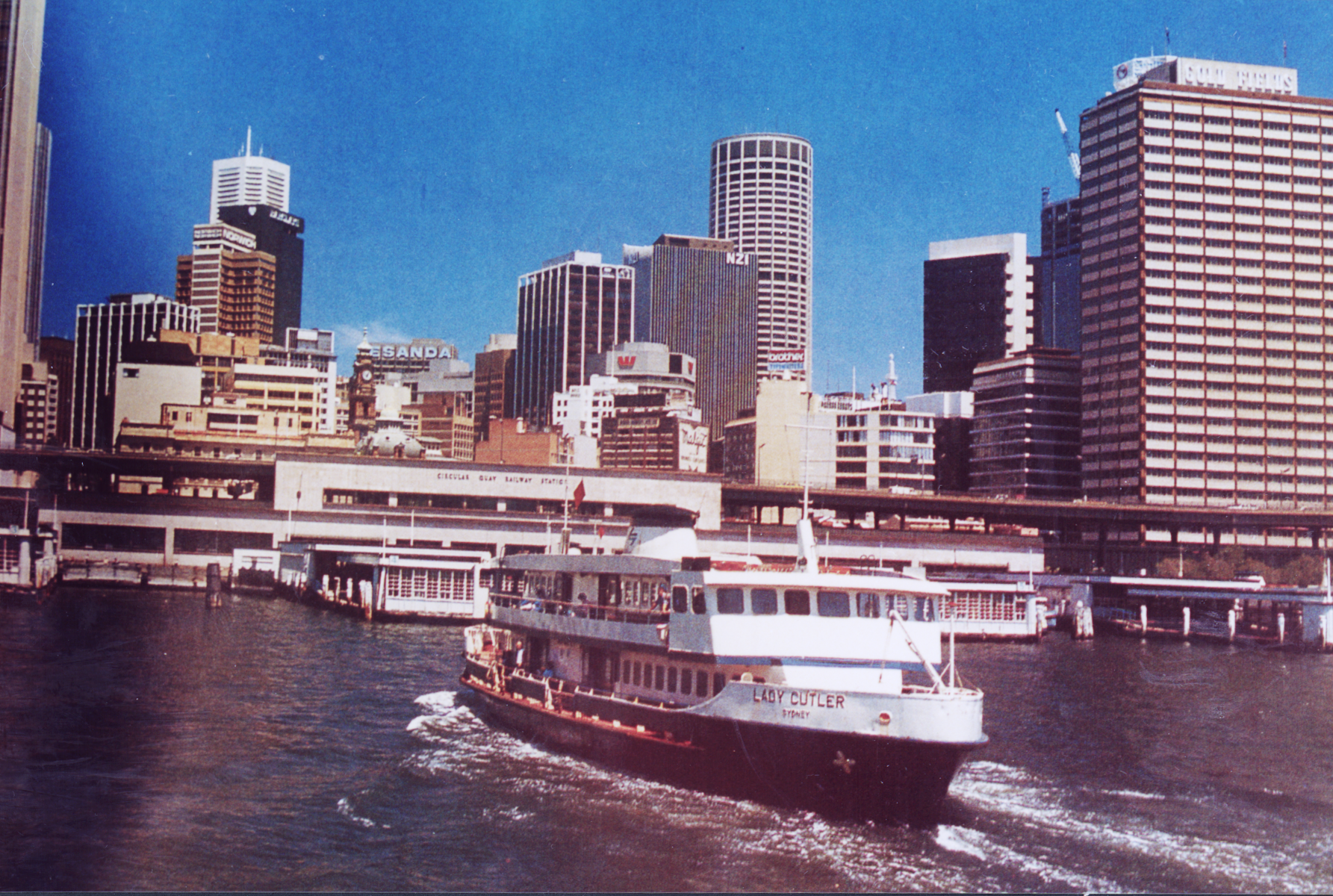
Lady Cutler approaches Circular Quay, circa 1980

Lady Cutler entered service on 8 October 1968 and was soon followed by sister ships, Lady Woodward and Lady McKell. For over twenty years she served the various routes within Sydney Harbour, but in 1991 she suffered engine and hull problems and was laid up in Rozelle Bay until offered for sale the following year.

She was sold to Hong Kong interests in 1996, along with her sister ships, but the deal fell through. In 1998 she was sold to Ron Morrison and then to Shannon Harper, leaving Port Jackson for Melbourne. In Melbourne, much of the steelwork on her hull and superstructure was replaced. Work was sporadic and stopped in 2004, awaiting more venture capital to bring her back into survey as a cruise ship operating in Port Phillip and the Port of Melbourne.

Jeff Gordon bought the vessel in 2007, providing the funds to complete the project. The deck steelwork was replaced and her steering and engine controls were reinstated. In June 2007 Lady Cutler sailed to Portland, where she was slipped and her hull surveyed. On the return voyage she encountered gale-force winds and large seas in the Bass Strait. Her engine broke down and she was towed to her berth. She completed her refurbishment in Melbourne in December 2007 and the following month was recommissioned by Lady Joan Cutler, Sir Roden Cutler's 2nd wife. Lady Cutler entered service as a tourist and party boat, branded as Melbourne Showboat.

== See also ==
- List of Sydney Harbour ferries
