= Helen Cutler =

Australian philanthropist

Helen, Lady Cutler AC DStJ
- Helen Cutler in 1974
- Born: Helen Gray Annetta Morris; 5 May 1923; Sydney
- Died: 8 November 1990 (aged 67); Darlinghurst, New South Wales
- Education: Sydney Church of England Girls' Grammar School
- Known for: lieutenant (AWAS); charity worker and patron
- Spouse: Sir Roden Cutler
- Children: 4 sons

Helen Gray Annetta Cutler, Lady Cutler AC, DStJ (née Morris; 5 May 1923 – 8 November 1990), was a lieutenant in the Australian Women's Army Service (AWAS) during World War II and an Australian charity worker and patron. She fulfilled public duties as wife of Sir Roden Cutler, governor of New South Wales.

== Early life and education ==
Born Helen Gray Annetta Morris in Sydney on 5 May 1923, Cutler was educated at Sydney Church of England Girls' Grammar School. She then completed a diploma at the Macquarie Secretarial School.

== War service ==
At the time of her enlistment in the Australian Women's Army Service on 17 September 1942, Cutler was working as a shorthand typist at The Trustees Executors & Agency Co Ltd. She was promoted lieutenant in 1944 and demobilised on 23 April 1946.

== Later career ==
As wife of the Governor of New South Wales, Cutler was made patron of many charities, including the Save the Children Fund from 1966 to 1981 and The Infants' Home Child and Family Services. She subsequently held the position of president from 1987 to 1990.

With her husband, Sir Roden, Cutler was recognised as having improved access to Government House by the general public.

Her papers are held with those of her husband, Sir Roden Cutler, by the State Library of New South Wales.

== Awards and legacy ==
In 1977 Cutler was made a Dame of the Order of St John of Jerusalem (DStJ). In the 1980 Queen's Birthday Honours she was appointed a Companion of the Order of Australia (AC) for "public and community service to the people of New South Wales".

Having resigned her commission in 1946, Cutler was appointed an Honorary Colonel of the Women's Royal Australian Army Corps (WRAAC), a position she held from 3 February 1967 to 1 June 1985.

The first Sydney ferry of the Lady Class was named Lady Cutler in her honour. It was launched in 1968 and decommissioned in 1991 after 22 years' service. The ferry is now a cruise vessel in Melbourne.

== Personal ==
Cutler married Arthur "Roden" Cutler VC on 28 May 1946. They had four sons. She died suddenly on 8 November 1990 at St Vincent's Hospital. Her funeral, held at St Andrew's Cathedral, Sydney, was attended by nearly 1,000 people. Her burial took place at South Head Cemetery.
