= Lady-class ferry =

Class of ferry operated by Harbour City Ferries

Lady class
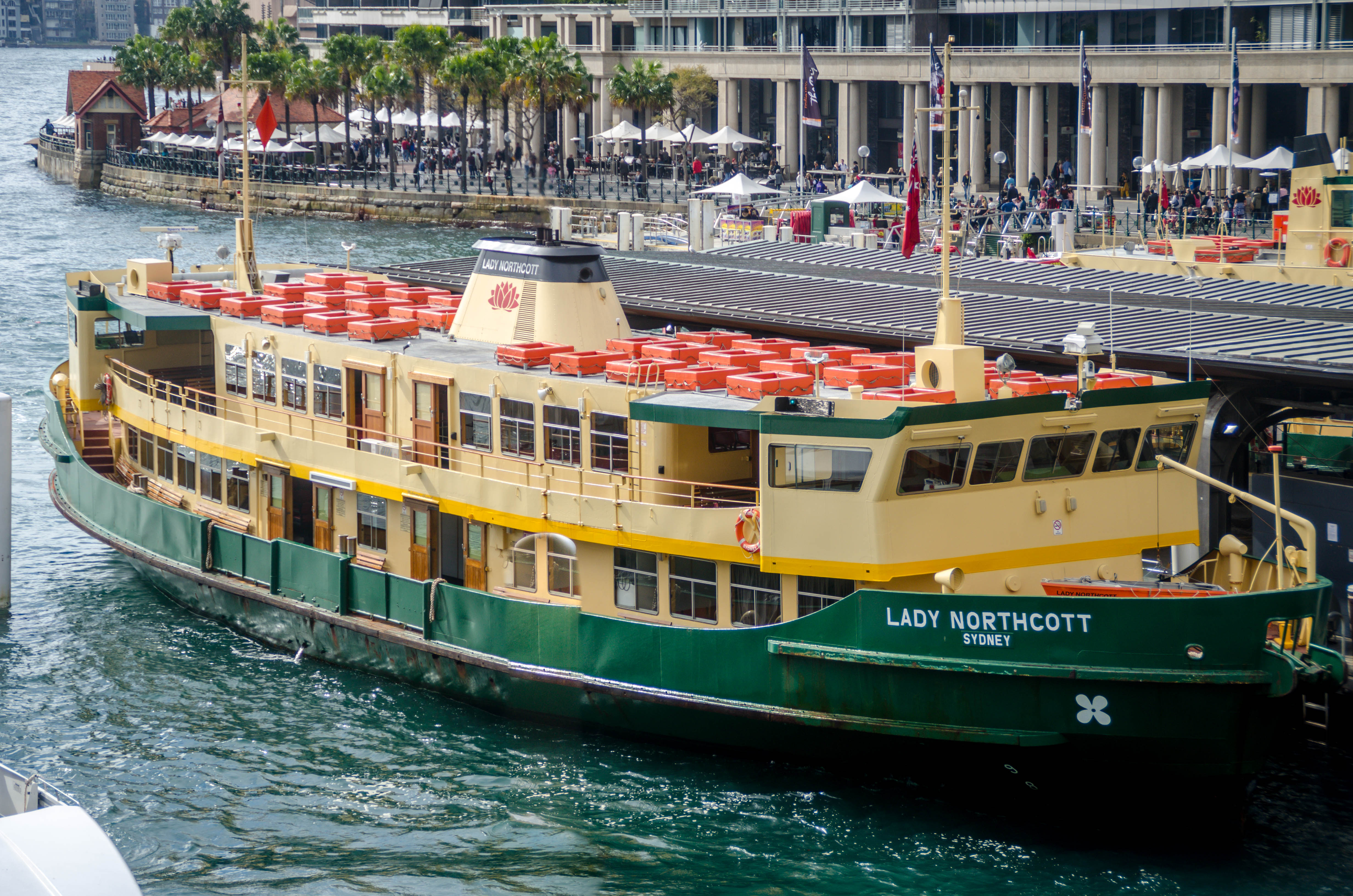
- Lady Northcott at Circular Quay in July 2013

Class overview
- Builders: State Dockyard; Carrington Slipways
- Operators: Sydney Harbour Transport Board; Public Transport Commission; Urban Transit Authority; State Transit Authority; Sydney Ferries; Harbour City Ferries
- Completed: 7
- Active: 3
- Laid up: 1
- Scrapped: 3

The Lady class is a class of ferry that were operated by Harbour City Ferries and its predecessors on Sydney Harbour. The term 'Lady class' was also used to describe five wooden-hulled double-ended ferries (Note: Refers to Lady Chelmsford, Lady Denman, Lady Ferguson, Lady Edeline, and Lady Scott.) that were operated on Sydney Harbour, from the 1910s to the early 1970s.

== History ==
In late 1967, the Sydney Harbour Transport Board placed an order for three ferries with the State Dockyard, Newcastle. Continuing the tradition of naming ferries after the wives of the Governors of New South Wales, Lady Cutler was launched on 10 August 1968 and arrived in Sydney on 19 September 1968.

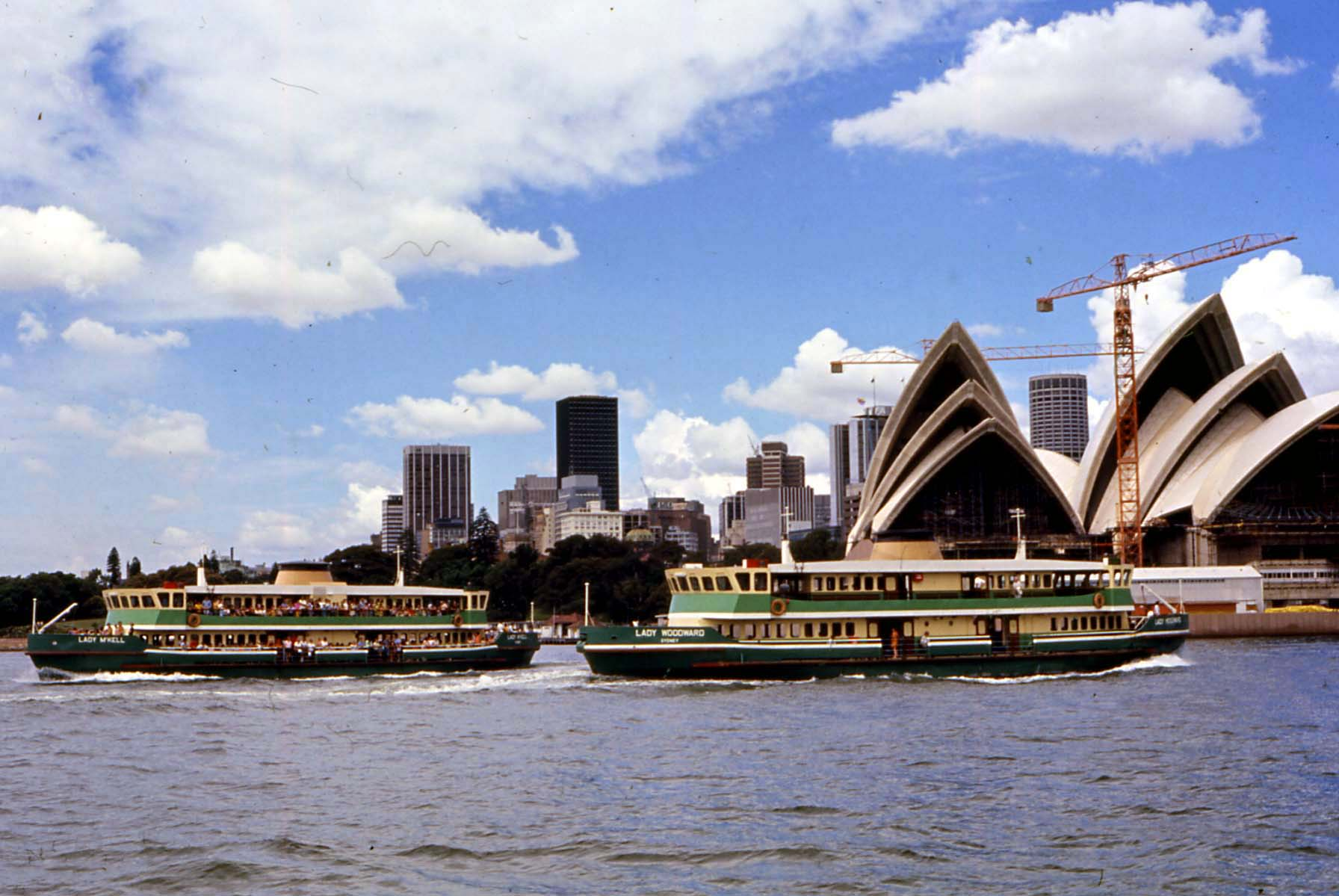
Lady Woodward and Lady McKell in 1970

It was followed in 1970 by Lady Woodward and Lady McKell. These two differed from Lady Cutler in having reverse sloped wheelhouses.

In 1974/75, two enlarged versions were built by Carrington Slipways, Lady Wakehurst and Lady Northcott. These were followed in 1979 by Lady Street and Lady Herron that were built at the State Dockyard.

Following a fire that gutted the South Steyne in August 1974, the Lady Wakehurst and Lady Northcott switched to the Manly service after having their bows built up to contend with the rougher conditions while crossing Sydney Heads and extra gangway openings cut into the upper deck. Following the Tasman Bridge disaster, Lady Wakehurst was sent to Hobart in January 1975 to operate services on the River Derwent, not returning until November 1977.

In the 1990s, the first three were withdrawn and placed in store at Rozelle Bay. A deal to sell them to Hong Kong fell through. Today, Lady Cutler and Lady McKell operate as cruise vessels on Port Phillip, the latter having had one wheelhouse removed and renamed Victoria Star. Lady Woodward was sold to Tasmania and converted for use as a salmon farm tender vessel. In 2010, it was sold to a citizen of Tin Can Bay for use as a houseboat. In May 2023, after being stored in Tin Can Bay for around 12 years, Lady Woodward was scrapped.

Lady Wakehurst was sold to Auckland in 1997, before returning to Sydney in 2001. It briefly returned to the Manly run in 2006 when chartered by Sydney Ferries. It moved to the Solomon Islands in 2011. Lady Street was withdrawn in October 2002. and was sold in December 2004 to be broken up with her scrapping being completed at Goat Island in 2007.

Lady Northcott and Lady Herron were removed from service in October 2017. In 2020 Lady Northcott was donated to Aboriginal Cruise company Tribal Warrior and sailed from Newcastle to Sydney, on 26 September 2022, under her own power after works were completed to get her back into service. After returning to Sydney, Lady Northcott was painted in a full black livery with traditional Aboriginal art decorating the superstructure. Other parts of the vessel including the funnel and masts are still in the Sydney Ferries cream colour and have yet to be repainted. Since her repaint, the Lady Northcott has operated harbour cruises for events such as New Year and Vivid Sydney. On 25 January 2023, Lady Northcott was renamed Wirawi, an Aboriginal word for woman. The renaming was accompanied by traditional Aboriginal ceremonies and celebrations.

Lady Herron was broken up for scrap between April and May 2024 after a lack of interest was shown in purchasing the vessel for reuse.

== Vessels ==
Name	Image	MMSI	Date launched	Namesake	Status
Lady Cutler		503334800	10 August 1968	Helen Cutler	Active, Port Phillip
Lady Woodward		7027813	19 October 1970	Eric Woodward	Scrapped in May 2023
Lady McKell		7029122	19 October 1970	William McKell	Renamed Victoria Star, active Port Phillip
Lady Wakehurst		7343449	6 July 1974	John Wakehurst	Laid up in Avi Avi Marina Solomon Islands.
Lady Northcott		503602000	26 September 1974	John Northcott	Withdrawn from Sydney ferries fleet in October 2017. Donated to the Aboriginal cruise company Tribal Warrior and was converted to a cruise vessel.
Lady Street		7810806	8 May 1979	Laurence Street	Withdrawn October 2002. Scrapped at Goat Island, Sydney in 2007.
Lady Herron		503601000	23 August 1979	Leslie Herron	Withdrawn October 2017, Harbour City Ferries Scrapped in May 2024.

== See also ==
- List of Sydney Harbour ferries
- Timeline of Sydney Harbour ferries
