= Edeline Strickland =

British Australian philanthropist (1870–1918)

Lady Edeline Strickland
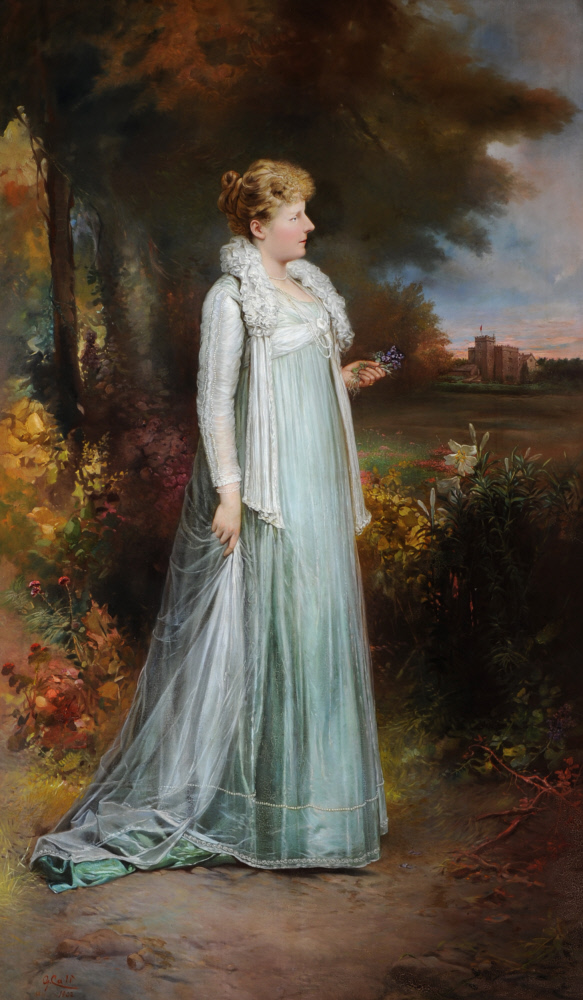
- Born: Edeline Sackville-West; 10 September 1870; Sevenoaks, Kent, England
- Died: 15 December 1918 (aged 48); Villa Bologna, Malta
- Known for: Founder and inaugural President of the New South Wales division of the Australian Red Cross
- Spouse: Gerald Strickland, 1st Baron Strickland
- Children: Mabel Strickland
- Father: Reginald Sackville, 7th Earl De La Warr

Lady Edeline Strickland (born Lady Edeline Sackville-West, 10 September 1870 – 15 December 1918) was the founder and president of the New South Wales division of the Australian Red Cross. She inspired the name of the Lady Edeline ferry, and the Edeline Islands.

== Early life and personal ==
Strickland was born Lady Edeline Sackville-West, to Constance Mary Elizabeth Baillie-Cochrane, and Reginald Windsor Sackville. Reginald was the 7th Earl De La Warr. She married Gerald Strickland in 1890. They had six daughters and two sons. One of their daughters was the politician and journalist Mabel Strickland.

== Career ==
Due to her husband's governing appointments, Strickland lived in the Leeward Islands from 1902, Tasmania, Australia from 1904, Western Australia from 1909, before arriving in Sydney in 1913. In Sydney she lived in Cranbrook in Rose Bay, and then Government House on Macquarie St until 1917 while her husband was the Governor of New South Wales.

Strickland had experienced poor health since 1912, which limited her ability to expend much physical energy. Doctors told her she needed to rest.

When World War I broke out in August 1914, Lady Helen Munro Ferguson wrote to Strickland, making her a member of the central branch of the Australian Red Cross, which Ferguson had formed in response to the war. Ferguson also invited Strickland to form and preside over the New South Wales division as its president.

Under her direction, Strickland's residences, first Cranbrook in Rose Bay, and then Government House on Macquarie St, Sydney became war working centres. The women who volunteered took over the supper room for daily meetings, and organising material goods for wounded soldiers.

Strickland inspired the name of the Lady Edeline Ferry, one of four ferries named for the wives of New South Wales Governors.

She also had a children's hospital named in her honour, the Lady Edeline Hospital for Sick Babies, in the historic Greycliffe House in Nielsen Park, Vaucluse.

She also had geographic features named after her, such as Lady Edeline Beach on Rottnest Island, and the Edeline Islands in the Kimberley region of Western Australia.

== Death ==
She died in Malta on 15 December 1918. Her funeral was on 16 December and she was buried in St Paul's Cathedral, Mdina in her family's vault.
