= Edeline Islands =

Islands in Western Australia

The Edeline Islands are in Strickland Bay, in the Kimberley region of Western Australia. They are nominally located at 16°22′S 123°36′E.

They are named after Lady Edeline Strickland, wife of Gerald Strickland, 1st Baron Strickland, for whom the bay is named. The islands are known locally as "The Graveyards", as the islands contain 19th-century graves of pearl divers.
