= Sydney Harbour Transport Board =

New South Wales government agency

statutory authority overview
- Formed: 20 June 1951
- Preceding statutory authority: Sydney Ferries Limited
- Dissolved: 30 November 1974
- Superseding statutory authority: Public Transport Commission
- Jurisdiction: Sydney Harbour
- Headquarters: Sydney
- Minister responsible: Milton Morris, Minister for Transport
- Key documents: Sydney Harbour Transport Act 1951 (NSW); Public Transport Commission & Sydney Harbour Transport (Amendment) Act 1974 (NSW)

The Sydney Harbour Transport Board was a statutory of the Government of New South Wales responsible for the provision of ferry services on Sydney Harbour from July 1951 until November 1974.

== History ==
With its Sydney Harbour services having become unprofitable, in March 1951 Sydney Ferries Limited advised the Government of New South Wales of its intention to cease operating ferry services on Sydney Harbour.

After investigating the possibility of using statutory powers to compulsorily acquire the business without paying compensation, the government agreed to purchase the business with 15 ferries from 1 July 1951. Pursuant to the Sydney Harbour Transport Act 1951 (NSW), the Sydney Harbour Transport Board (SHTB) was established. As the board did not have any experience of ferry management, day-to-day running was contracted out to the Port Jackson & Manly Steamship Company.

In 1956, the Kooleen was purchased. This single deck ferry which the SHTB intended would be the first of many had no outside seating and was much derided. As a result, it was decided to retain the existing fleet, albeit with the remaining steam powered examples converted to diesel power. Between 1968 and 1970, three Lady class ferries were purchased.

Pursuant to the Public Transport Commission & Sydney Harbour Transport (Amendment) Act 1974 (NSW), the functions of the SHTB were transferred to the Public Transport Commission on 1 December 1974.

== See also ==
- Timeline of Sydney Harbour ferries
