= Myola, New South Wales =

Myola
- Suburb
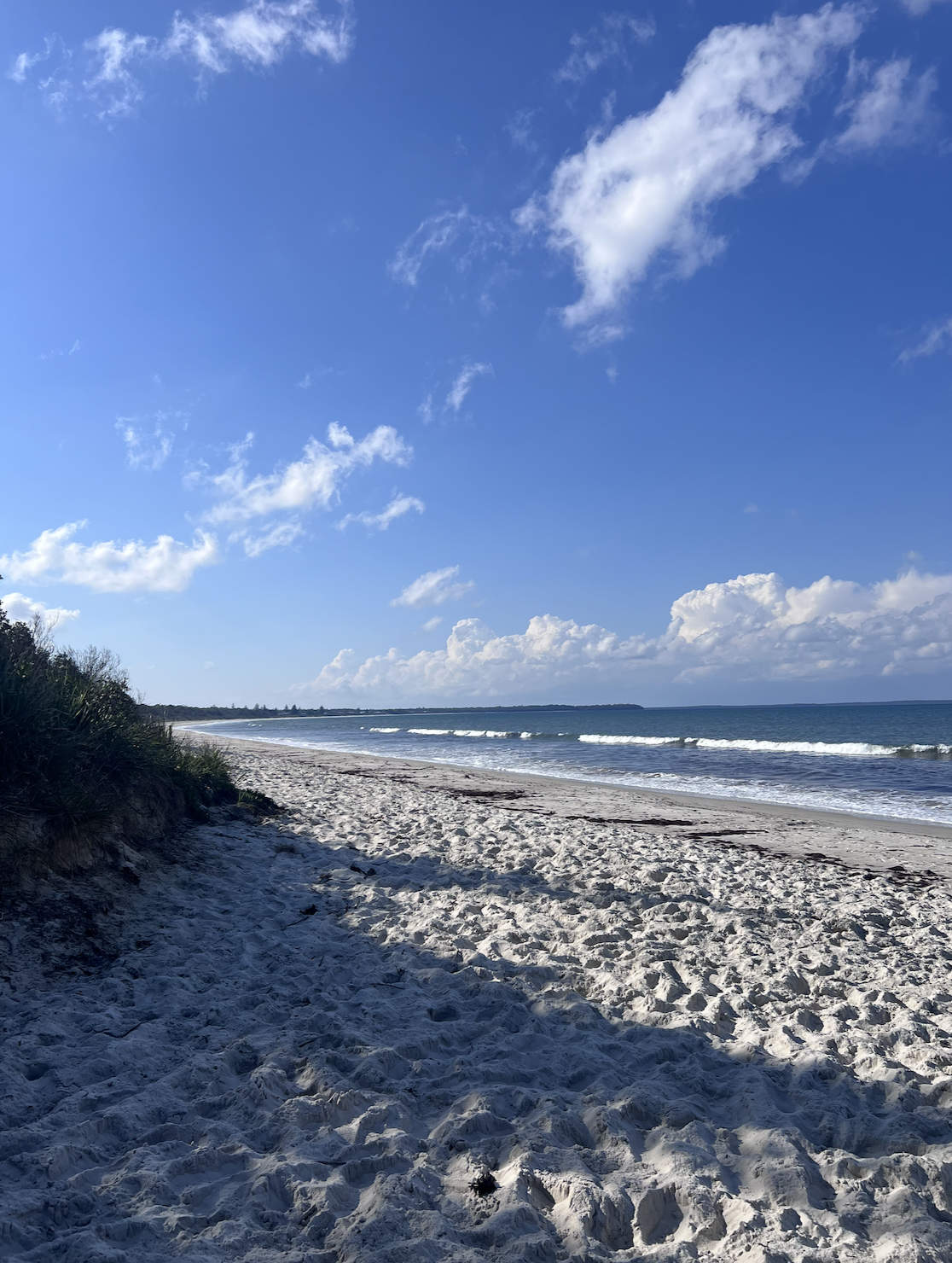
- Callala Beach on the Myola side

- Coordinates: 35°00′57″S 150°41′02″E
- Country: Australia
- State: New South Wales
- Region: South Coast
- LGA: City of Shoalhaven
- Location: 26 km (16 mi) SE of Nowra; 195 km (121 mi) S of Sydney

Government
  - State electorate: South Coast
  - Federal division: Gilmore

Population
  - Total: 94 (2021 census)
- Postcode: 2540
- County: St Vincent
- Parish: Currambene
Suburbs around Myola
Comberton	Comberton	Callala Beach
Woollamia	Myola	Jervis Bay
Huskisson	Huskisson	Jervis Bay

Myola is a beach-side locality in the City of Shoalhaven in New South Wales, Australia. It lies about 26 km southeast of Nowra on the northeastern shore of Jervis Bay. It is on the opposite side of Currambene Creek from Huskisson, although there is no direct road connection. At the 2021 census, it had a population of 94.
