= Parish of Tomerong =

- Cadastral division
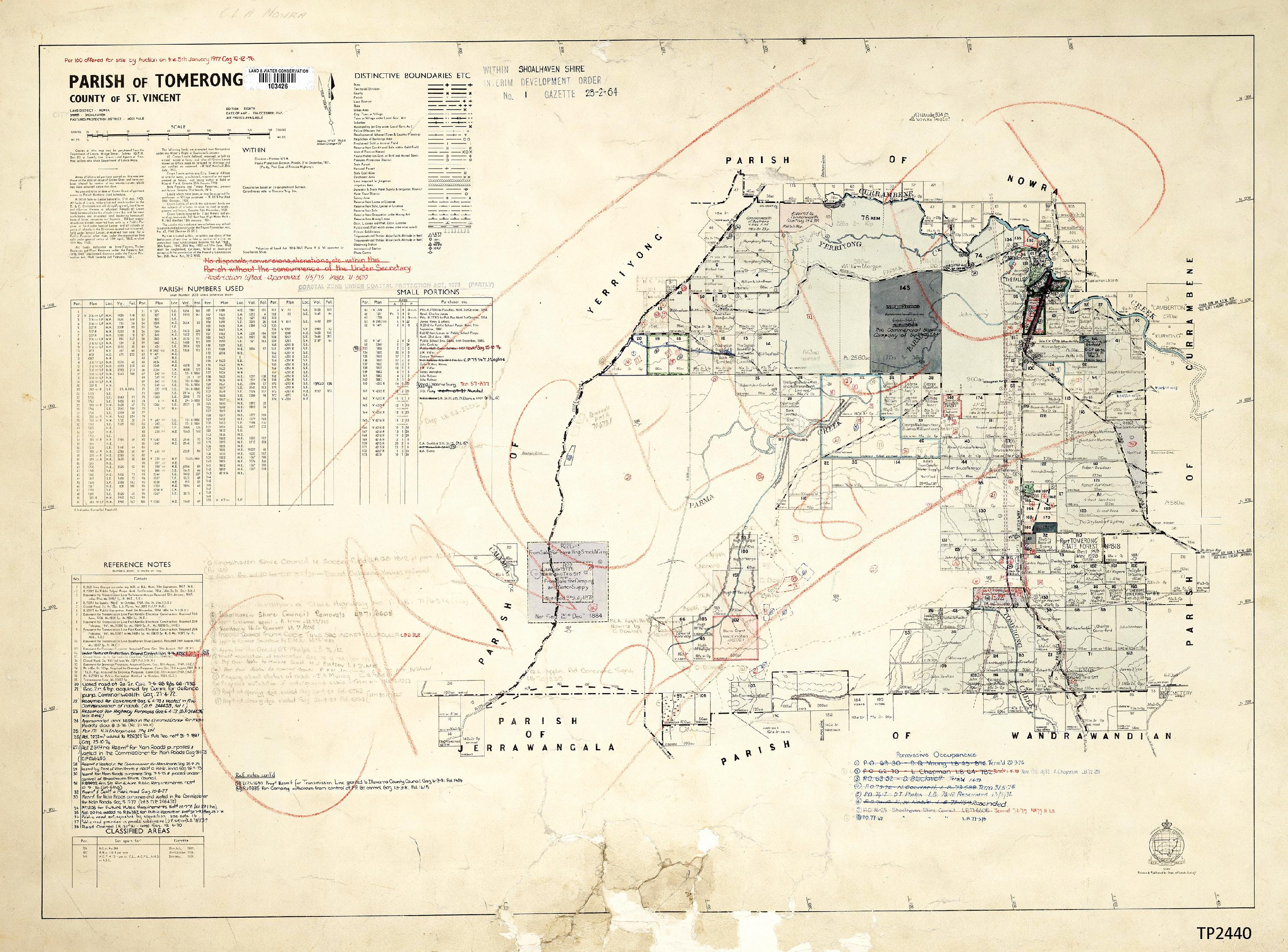

- Interactive map of Parish of Tomerong
- Coordinates: 35°00′44″S 150°34′50″E
- Country: Australia
- State: New South Wales
- City: Shoalhaven
- LGA: Shoalhaven
- County: St Vincent
Lands administrative divisions around Parish of Tomerong
Nowra	Nowra	Currambene
Yerriyong		Currambene
Jerrawangala	Wandrawandian	Currambene

The Parish of Tomerong is one of about 76 parishes located in St Vincent County on the South Coast of New South Wales. Part of the colony of NSW around the settlement of Sydney, was divided into nineteen counties and St Vincent was the southernmost of these. Parish maps were used to record land holdings, ownership and use. The parish is now located in the local government area of the City of Shoalhaven but was previously part of the Clyde Shire.

The Parish of Tomerong stretches from Currambene Creek in the north to Tomerong village in the south; west to the Parish of Yerriyong and east to the Parish of Currambene. It encompasses part of the villages of Tomerong and Falls Creek and has the major transport route of the Princes Highway passing from north to south.
