= Callala Beach =

- Town
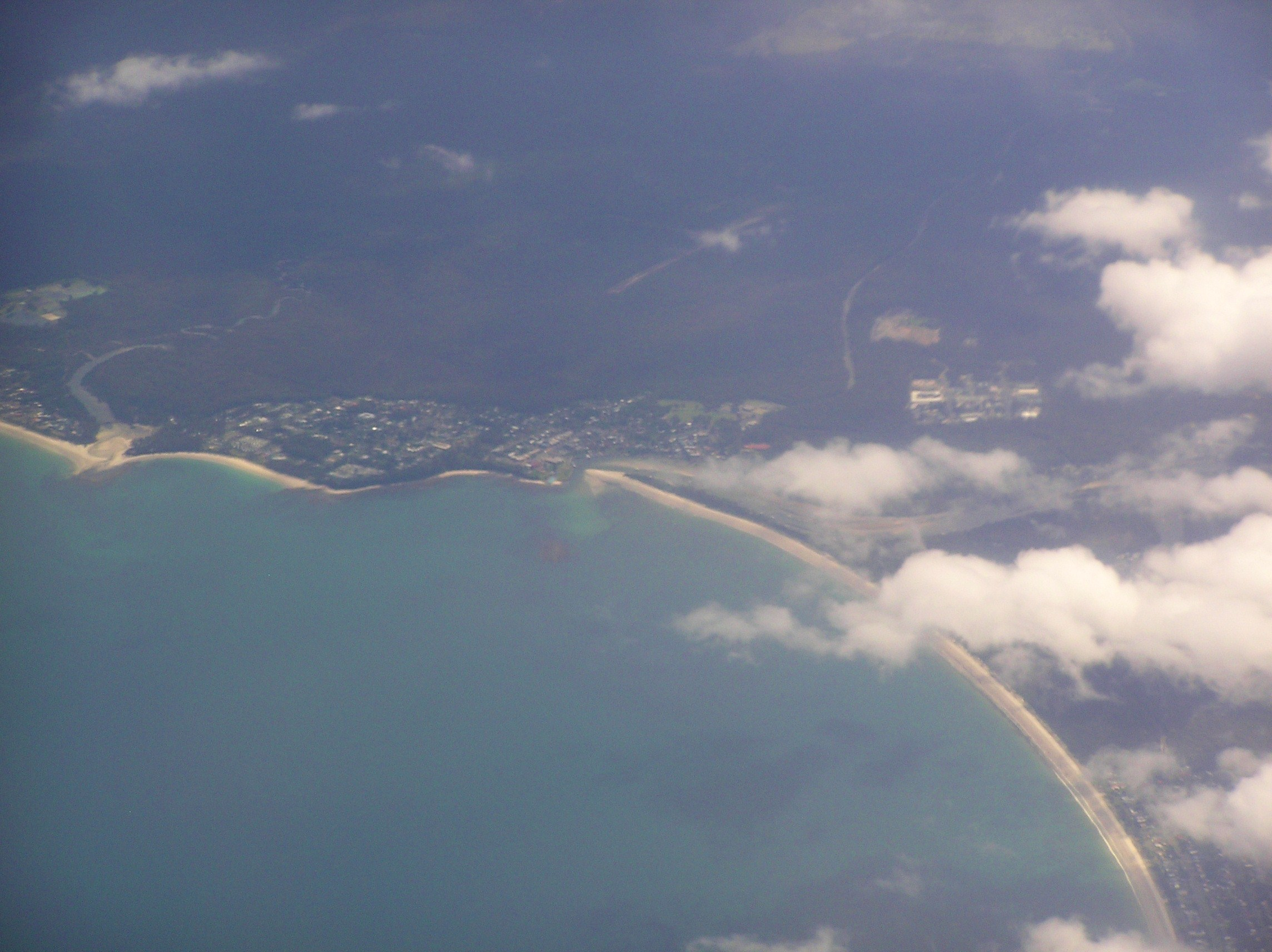

- Coordinates: 35°00′12.2″S 150°42′00″E
- Country: Australia
- State: New South Wales
- Region: South Coast
- LGA: City of Shoalhaven
- Location: 130 km (81 mi) S of Sydney; 16 km (9.9 mi) SE of Nowra

Government
  - State electorate: South Coast
  - Federal division: Gilmore
- Elevation: 14 m (46 ft)

Population
  - Total: 803 (2016 census)
- Postcode: 2540
- County: St Vincent
- Parish: Wollumboola
Localities around Callala Beach
| Wollumboola | Wollumboola | Callala Bay |
| Woollamia | Callala Beach | Jervis Bay |
| Myola | Myola | Jervis Bay |

Callala Beach is a small town on the South Coast of New South Wales, Australia in the City of Shoalhaven. Like most beaches in Jervis Bay, it is known to have brilliantly white sand and aqua blue waters. The beach is a tourist spot and is a 2.5-hour drive from Sydney, located to its south.

== Geography ==
The town is situated on the northern shore of Jervis Bay about 20 minutes drive from Nowra and 10 minutes from Culburra Beach. Callala Beach varies in elevation from 1 metre (3 ft 3 in) to 27 metres (89 ft) above sea level, and is located inland from Callala Point, a headland facing the Tasman Sea. Nearby settlements include Currarong to the south-east and Culburra Beach to the north-east.

== Tourism ==
Local services include a popular Club with daily activities and entertainment, eighteen hole golf course, two bowling greens and auditorium for functions and bands. The area has a number of seaside motels. There is also a community hall.

== Sport and recreation ==
- Club Callala (Callala RSL Country Club)
- Callala Beach Triathlon

== See also ==
- Hyams Beach, a beach to the south which also features crystal blue waters and fine white sand.
