= Comberton, New South Wales =

Small Locality in New South Wales

Comberton
- Suburb
- Coordinates: 34°56′49″S 150°36′29″E
- Country: Australia
- State: New South Wales
- Region: South Coast
- LGA: Shoalhaven
- Location: 7 km (4.3 mi) S of Nowra; 15 km (9.3 mi) W of Culburra Beach; 135 km (84 mi) SW of Sydney

Government
  - State electorate: South Coast
  - Federal division: Gilmore

Population
  - Total: 31 (2021 census)
- Postcode: 2540
Suburbs around Comberton
| Nowra Hill | South Nowra | Worrigee |
| Nowra Hill | Comberton | Wollumboola |
| Falls Creek | Falls Creek | Woollamia |

Comberton is a small locality located in the Shoalhaven Region of New South Wales. As of 2021 census it has a population of 31. Only 10 houses exist in the locality, all of them in the west of the large locality, near the turn-off of the Princes Highway and Forest Road. The remainder of the locality consists of the Nowra and Currambene state forests. Forest road goes through the entire suburb before splitting off into Coonemia road, Callala Bay road and Currarong Road. The southern border of the locality is at the Currambene Creek.
