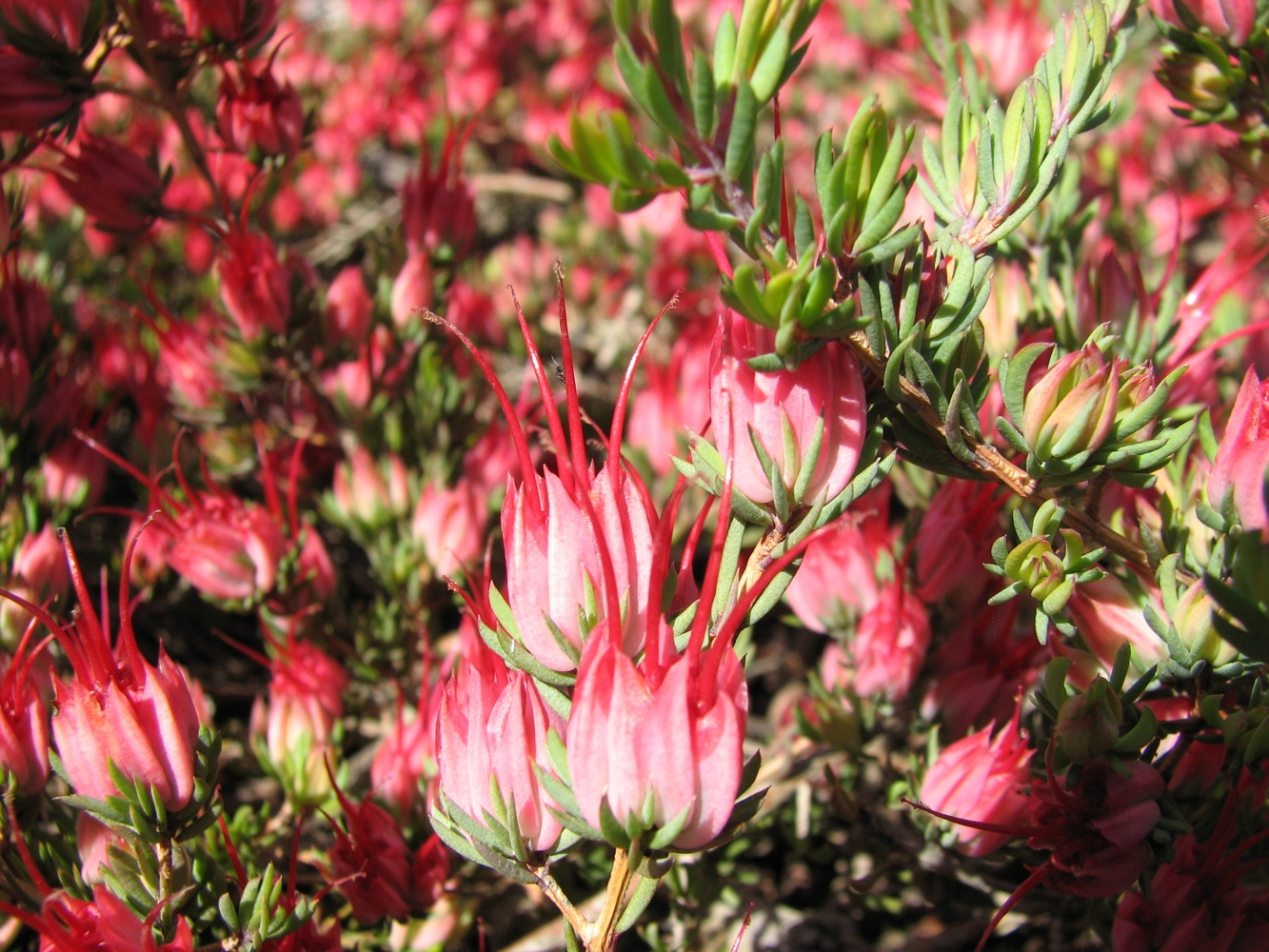
- Darwinia taxifolia subsp. macrolaena in the Royal Botanic Gardens, Cranbourne

Scientific classification
- Kingdom: Plantae
- Clade: Tracheophytes
- Clade: Angiosperms
- Clade: Eudicots
- Clade: Rosids
- Order: Myrtales
- Family: Myrtaceae
- Genus: Darwinia
- Species: D. taxifolia

Binomial name
- Darwinia taxifolia A.Cunn.
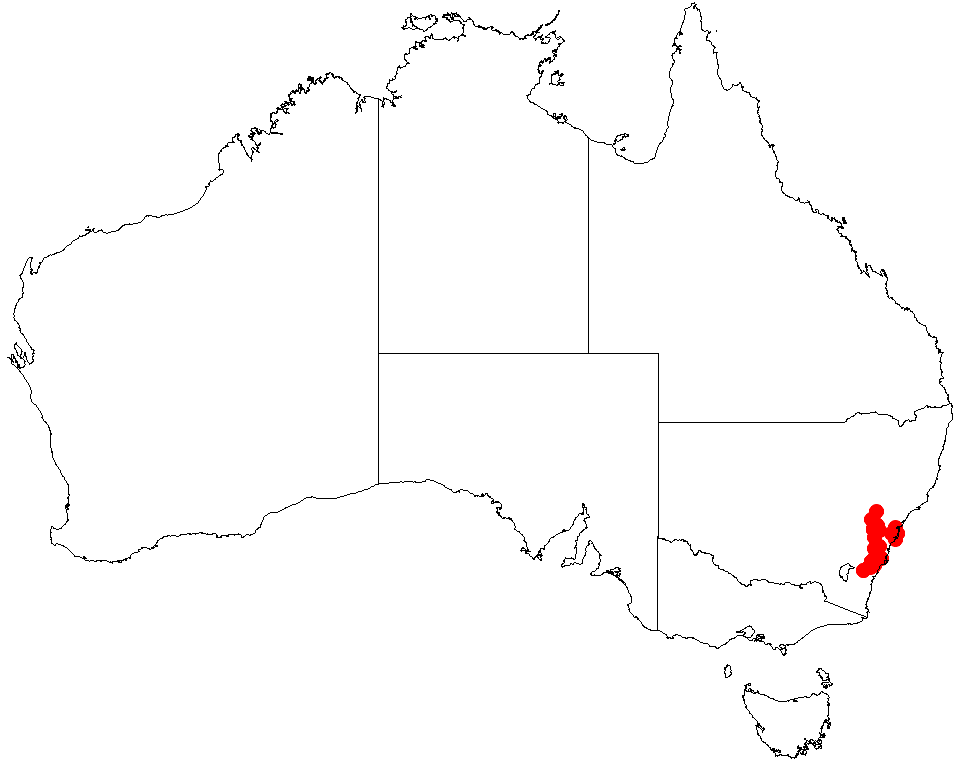
- Occurrence data from AVH

Synonyms
- Darwinia intermedia Schauer nom. inval., pro syn.; Darwinia laxifolia Schauer nom. illeg., nom. superfl.

= Darwinia taxifolia =

Species of flowering plant

Darwinia taxifolia is a species of flowering plant in the myrtle family Myrtaceae and is endemic to New South Wales. It is an erect or low-lying shrub with laterally compressed leaves. The flowers are pink or purplish and usually arranged in groups of two to four.

== Description ==
Darwinia taxifolia is an erect or low-lying shrub that typically grows to a height of up to 1 m (3 ft 3 in). Its leaves are 5–12 mm (0.20–0.47 in) long and laterally compressed so that they are thicker than wide. The flowers are arranged in clusters of 2 to 4, rarely up to 6, the clusters on a peduncle about 1 mm (0.039 in) long surrounded by rough, leaf-like bracts and pink or purplish bracteoles 3–8 mm (0.12–0.31 in) long. The floral tube is 5–9 mm (0.20–0.35 in) long and 1–2 mm (0.039–0.079 in) wide, and the style is red. Flowering occurs from September to December.

== Taxonomy ==
Darwinia taxifolia was first formally described in 1825 by Allan Cunningham in Geographical Memoirs on New South Wales, based on plant material collected from rocky areas of the Blue Mountains. The specific epithet (taxifolia) means "yew tree-leaved".

In 1962, Barbara G. Briggs described three subspecies in Contributions from the New South Wales National Herbarium, and the names of two are accepted by the Australian Plant Census:

- Darwinia taxifolia subsp. macrolaena B.G.Briggs has bracteoles 7–14 mm (0.28–0.55 in) long and a style 15–24 mm (0.59–0.94 in) long.
- Darwinia taxifolia A.Cunn. subsp.taxifolia has bracteoles 5–8 mm (0.20–0.31 in) long and a style 6–12 mm (0.24–0.47 in) long.

== Distribution and habitat ==
Subspecies macrolaena grows in heath and is found from the Blue Mountains to Nerriga and Tomerong in south-eastern New South Wales, and subspecies taxifolia is restricted to heath on elevated sites in the Blue Mountains.
