= Nowra Hill =

- Suburb
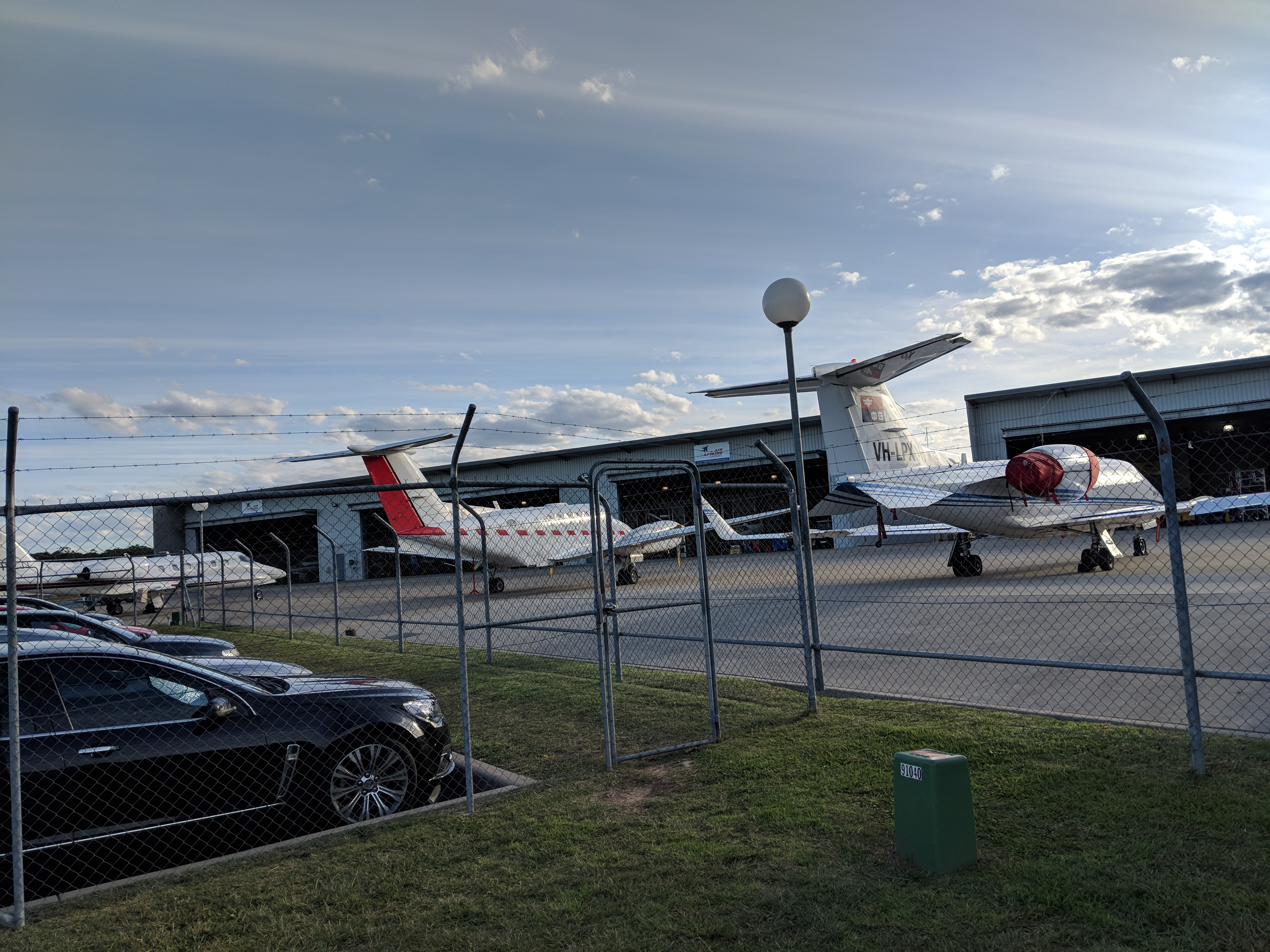
- Albatross Aviation Technology Park

- Coordinates: 34°55′56″S 150°33′04″E
- Country: Australia
- State: New South Wales
- Region: South Coast
- LGA: City of Shoalhaven
- Location: 179 km (111 mi) S of Sydney; 10 km (6.2 mi) S of Nowra; 60 km (37 mi) N of Ulladulla

Government
  - State electorate: South Coast
  - Federal division: Gilmore
- Elevation: 125 m (410 ft)

Population
  - Total: 2,095 (2016 census)
- Postcode: 2540
- County: St Vincent
- Parish: Nowra
Suburbs around Nowra Hill
Bamarang	Mundamia	South Nowra
Yerriyong	Nowra Hill	Comberton
Parma	Falls Creek	Comberton

Nowra Hill is a suburb of Nowra in the City of Shoalhaven in New South Wales, Australia. It lies southwest of Nowra on the western side of the Princes Highway. HMAS Albatross is located on the western edge of the suburb. At the 2021 census, it had a population of 2,141.
