= Parma, New South Wales =

Parma
- Suburb
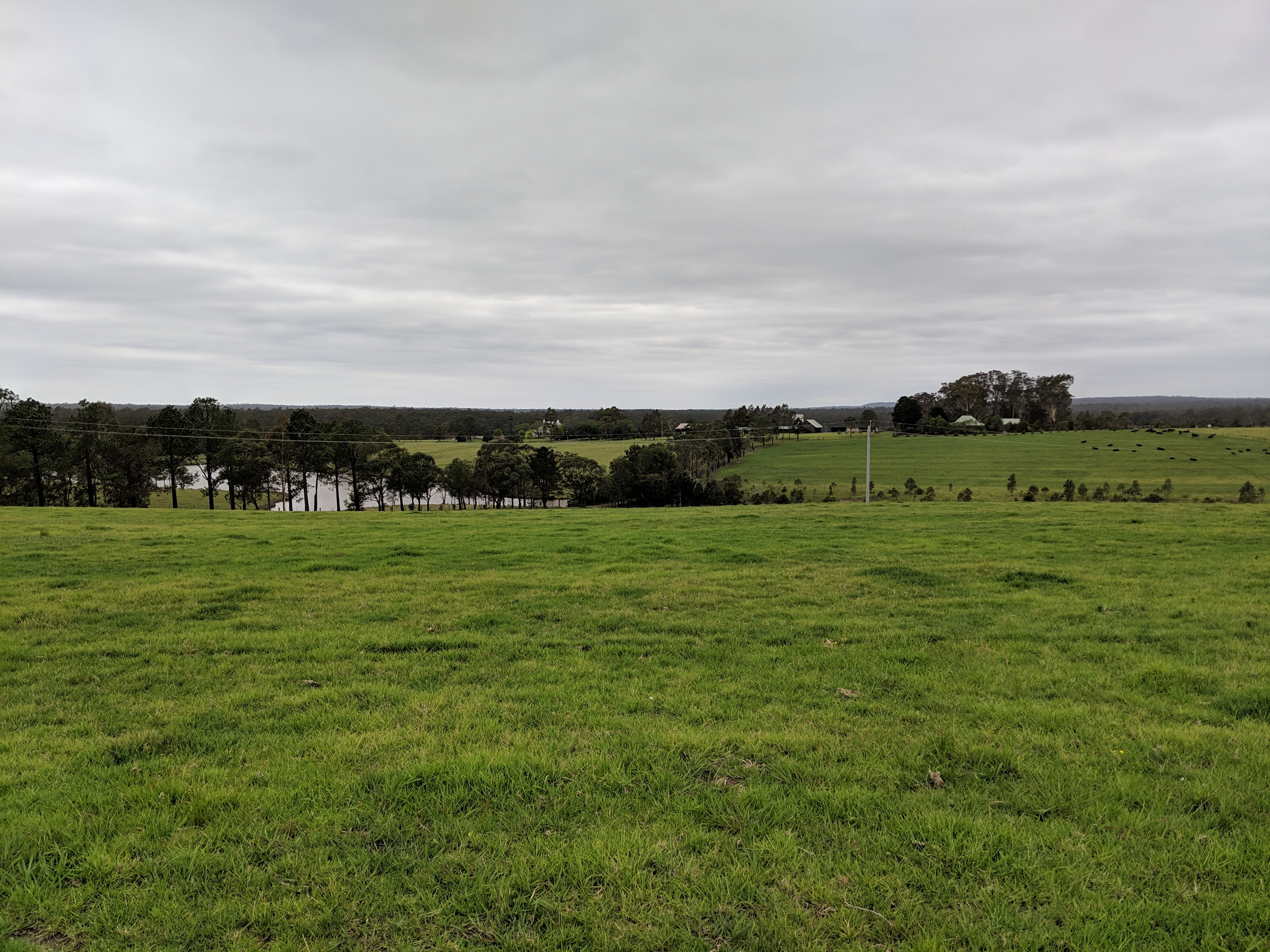

- Coordinates: 34°57′57″S 150°32′02″E
- Country: Australia
- State: New South Wales
- Region: South Coast
- LGA: City of Shoalhaven
- Location: 185 km (115 mi) S of Sydney; 16 km (9.9 mi) SW of Nowra

Government
  - State electorate: Kiama
  - Federal division: Gilmore

Population
  - Total: 167 (SAL 2021)
- Postcode: 2540
- County: St Vincent
- Parish: Tomerong
Suburbs around Parma
| Yerriyong | Nowra Hill | Falls Creek |
| Yerriyong | Parma | Falls Creek |
| Yerriyong | Yerriyong | Falls Creek |

Parma is a locality in the City of Shoalhaven in New South Wales, Australia. It lies about 16 km to the southwest of Nowra to the west of the Princes Highway. It is largely made up of grazing land or rural residences. At the 2016 census, it had a population of 169. It was previously called "Parma Ville".
