= Yalwal =

Yalwal New South Wales
- Coordinates: 34°56′00″S 150°23′00″E
- Population: 0 (2016 census)
- Postcode(s): 2540
- Elevation: 142 m (466 ft)
- Location: 29 km (18 mi) W of Nowra; 143 km (89 mi) ESE of Goulburn; 190 km (118 mi) SW of Sydney
- LGA(s): City of Shoalhaven
- Region: South Coast
- County: St Vincent
- Parish: Danjera; Yalwal
- State electorate(s): South Coast
- Federal division(s): Gilmore
Localities around Yalwal:
Ettrema	Buangla	Barringella
Ettrema	Yalwal	Yerriyong
St George	Boolijah	Jerrawangala

Yalwal is the site of a former gold mining town of the same name. It is situated 29 km (18 mi) west of Nowra at the confluence of the Danjera and Yarramunmun Creeks, which then form Yalwal Creek which flows into the Shoalhaven River in New South Wales, Australia.

It is now the site of a City of Shoalhaven managed picnic area and Danjera Dam. Yalwal is also the name of a modern locality, which includes the former mining town but extends over an extensive area of forests to its south, which largely forms parts of the Morton National Park. It is also the name of a parish, which lies to the north of the former mining town and generally north of the locality of Yalwal, generally in the area of the modern locality of Ettrema.

The area now known as Yalwal lies on the traditional lands of Wandandian people, a group of Yuin people.

== Geology ==
The valleys of the area cut into Devonian quartzite and phyllites while the plateau consists of Permian sandstones. Rhyolite and granite also outcrop in the area. Carboniferous granite intruded into the Upper Devonian sediments and the gold deposits are a result of replacement and impregnation by siliceous solutions bearing gold and sulphides. Silver, copper, tin, lead, arsenic and zinc ores have also been found in the area.

== Mining ==
Gold was first discovered in the area by Rev W.B. Clarke in 1852. Successful sluicing operations began in 1870 by J. Sivewright and party but were disrupted by the great flood of 1871. In 1872 open cut mining operations were begun at the Pinnacle when the main reef was discovered. The first shafts were sunk in the Homeward Bound mine in 1872 with payable gold found in 1874. In 1875, the first stamp battery (5 head) was erected. 1934 was the last discovery with the Fountainhead.

The quartz reefs there could be exceptionally rich. One crushing, in 1895, of nine tons of rock, yielded 337.5 ounces of gold.

== Mining village ==
In 1880 a mail receiving station was opened and Yalwal Post Office opened on 1 January 1883. In 1884 a public school opened; it closed in 1918, reopened in 1924 and finally closed in 1928.

In 1895 the nearby Grassy Gully mine was discovered. In 1890 all the usable scrap iron in the town was bought by scrap dealers from Nowra. Further dismantling of the town occurred during the First World War when building materials were used for the war effort.

In 1939 devastating bushfire destroyed most of what was left of the town with only one residence, one shop and the Post Office surviving. There was one fatality. Another bushfire, in 1953, destroyed five buildings, including the Post Office and three houses; twelve people survived by staying in the creek until the danger had passed, as had seventeen people in the 1939 fire.

== After mining ==
Mining operations after the 1939 fire dwindled, until 1971, when the Shoalhaven Council finished construction of the Danjera Dam which flooded most of the former town site and the lower mines.

Some mine shafts and other diggings, the graveyard (the oldest grave dated 1854) and a stamping battery (five head) can still be seen. Of the 35 or so mine workings accessible by foot (or canoe) some are safe enough for a young child to walk and climb through whilst others are extremely dangerous. If in doubt, don't enter. The main mine workings are about 15 minutes walk from the car park and can entertain for the entire day. There are two maps of the mines known to be in existence with the latter from the mid-1990s, prepared by a local surveyor/town planner is considered the most accurate.

Part of the area was affected by the 2019-2020 bushfires. In recent years, management of the historic former mines area has changed to an approach of exclusion, with interpretive signage concerning the mines and history having been removed by April 2021. Newer signage is about what is prohibited rather than the history of Yalwal and its mines.

The area is now the site of Danjera Dam a part of the Shoalhaven water supply and the site of a picnic area. Canoeing and swimming are allowed on the Dam but power boats are prohibited. The Dam stretches 7 km to the south with some good bass fishing. The previous beautiful upstream grassy river banks have been lost due to a lack of cattle grazing, these areas are now overgrown with blackberries.

== Sources ==
- Andrews, E.C.; Report on the Yalwal goldfield, Government Printer, Sydney, 1901
- David, T.W. Edgeworth; The Geology of the Commonwealth of Australia Vol II, Edward Arnold & Co, London, (date unknown)
- Glasson, David; Yalwal Gold, Sprint Print, Ballina, 1987
- Packham, G.H. (ed.); The Geology of New South Wales, Geological Society of Australia, Sydney, 1969
- Pittman, E.F.; The Mineral Resources of New South Wales, Government Printer, Sydney, 1901
- Sussmilch, C.A.; An Introduction to the Geology of New South Wales, Angus & Robertson, Sydney, 1914
- Shoalhaven City Council, Yalwal management plan - fact sheet
- Evans, W.R., "Gold And The Barron Of Grassy Gully", Nowra
