= MV Lady Denman =

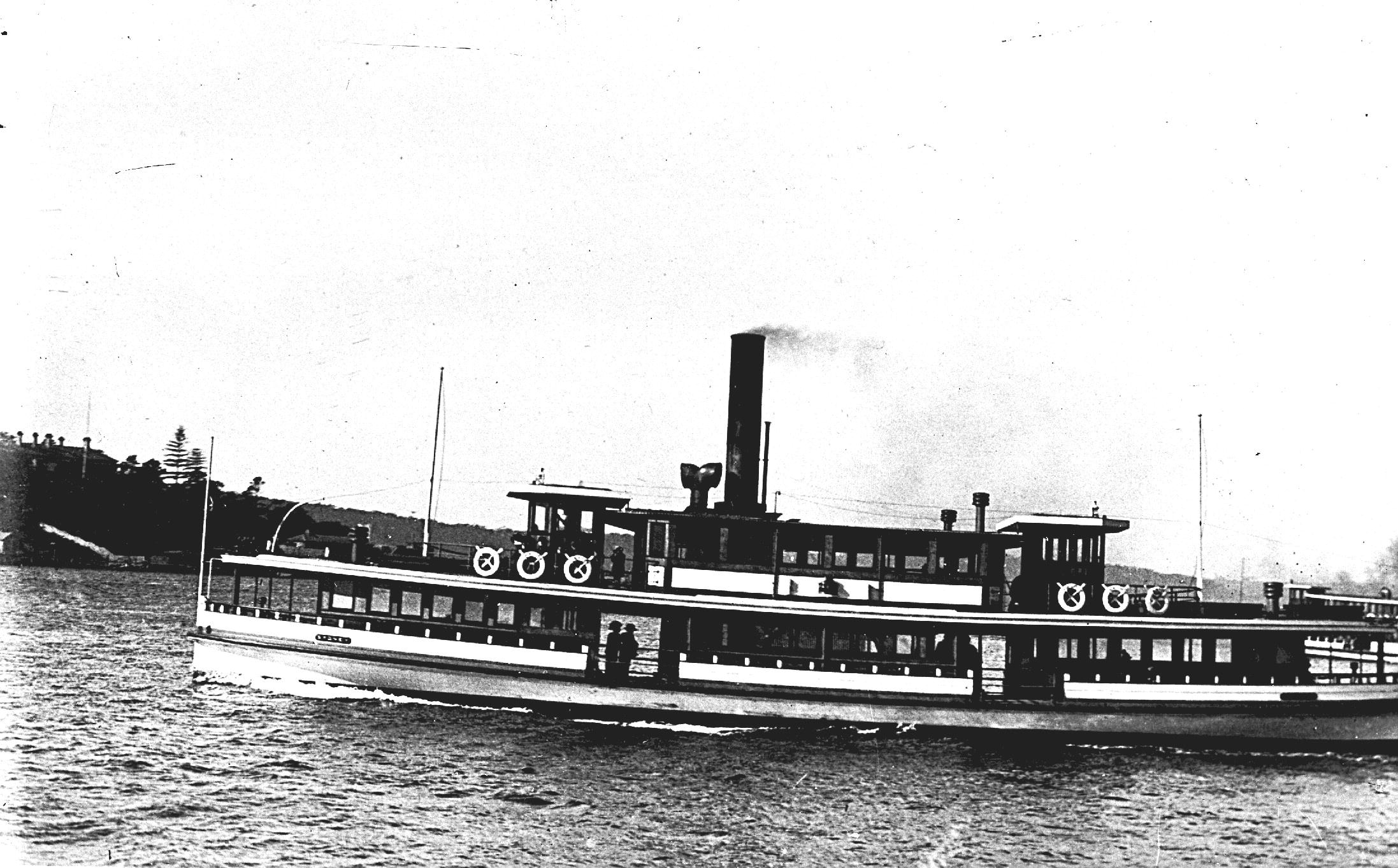
- As a steamer, 1920s

History

Australia
- Name: Lady Denman
- Namesake: Gertrude Denman, Baroness Denman
- Operator: Balmain New Ferry Company, Sydney Ferries Ltd, Sydney Harbour Transport Board, Public Transport Commission
- Builder: Joseph Dent, Huskisson
- Launched: 5 December 1911
- Completed: 1912
- Out of service: 1979
- Identification: O/N 131510
- Fate: donated for preservation

General characteristics
- Tonnage: 96 tons
- Length: 33.7 m (111 ft)
- Beam: 7.6 m
- Decks: 2
- Propulsion: 38 hp compound steam, diesel (from 1936)
- Speed: 11 knots as built, 9 knots as diesel
- Capacity: 500 passengers

Lady Denman is a former Sydney Harbour ferry built in 1912 for the Balmain New Ferry Company. She was later run by Sydney Ferries Limited and its government successors. She is now preserved at the Jervis Bay Maritime Museum near her original build site in Huskisson, New South Wales, Australia.

She and four similar ferries, Lady Chelmsford (1910), Lady Edeline (1913), Lady Ferguson (1914), and Lady Scott (1914), were a new series of "Lady-class", designed by naval architect, Walter Reeks. The five survived the 1932 opening of the Sydney Harbour Bridge and were all converted to diesel power that decade. They also survived the 1951 NSW State Government takeover of the ailing ferry fleet. Lady Denman was removed from ferry service in 1979 and donated for preservation. She is the last extant double-ended timber ferry, a type that was once prolific on Sydney Harbour.

Continuing a Balmain Ferry Co convention of naming their ferries after the wives of Governors-General of Australia and Governors of NSW, Lady Denman was named after Gertrude Denman, wife of fifth Governor-General of Australia. This naming nomenclature was again used by the State Government harbour ferry operator with the introduction of 6 new "Lady-class ferries" in the 1960s and 1970s.

== Design and construction ==
In common with most Sydney Harbour ferries at the time, Lady Denman and her four sisters were wooden double-ended screw steamers. The five ferries had only a single propeller at one end that pushed the vessels in one direction and pulled them in the other. This feature was introduced by the ferry's designer, Walter Reeks, on a previous Balmain company ferry, Lady Rawson of 1906. The configuration contrasted with the double-ended vessels of Sydney Ferries Limited (the K-class ferries) which had a continuous propeller shaft and a screw at each end. A single propeller and one shaft simplified the internal arrangements and put less stress on the timber hulls compared to shafts running a propeller at either end. Apart from some unusual handling characteristics, the single-propeller configuration was a success and Reeks unsuccessfully tried to patent it.

The hulls of Lady Denman, and one other of the five sisters, Lady Scott (1914), were built by Joseph Dent Limited on the banks of Currambene Creek at Huskisson from local timber milled at the Dent sawmill. Her keel was cut from 96 foot spotted gum, carted by two bullock teams. The hull was launched on 5 December 1911, then floated to Sydney carrying a load of timber doubling as ballast and a commercial product. Machinery installation and upperworks were completed in Sydney possibly by Morrison and Sinclair.

Lady Denman is 33.6m long, 7.6m wide (110.4 x 25.0 x 9.0 feet), displacing 96 gross tons. She has two passenger decks with two wheelhouses on her promenade deck, and the engine room in hull. She was fitted with lavatories & wooden batten seats. The main deck originally featured a woman's saloon. Spotted gum used extensively in its construction. With construction of a Sydney Harbour Bridge seeming likely, she and her four sisters were designed for a maximum of fifteen years of life. Instead, she would go on operating on the harbour until 1979. Because she was only to have a limited life-span, she was lightly built and almost austere in her fittings, such as her roof of galvanised iron. They were relatively small and had the shape of a 'V' and shallow draft to navigate the muddy and silted upper reaches of their upstream runs. Lady Chelmsford (1910) was built by Brisbane Water shipbuilder Rock Davis, Lady Edeline (1913) by G A Washington of Annandale and Lady Ferguson (1914) was built by David Drake Limited of Balmain.

Her original engines were 38 hp (nominal) compound steam engines were by Chapman and Co Ltd which pushed her to 10 knots.

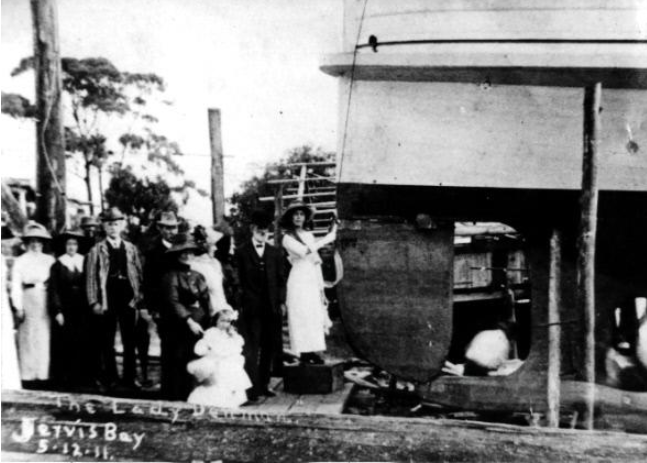
Launch day, Huskisson, 5 December 1911

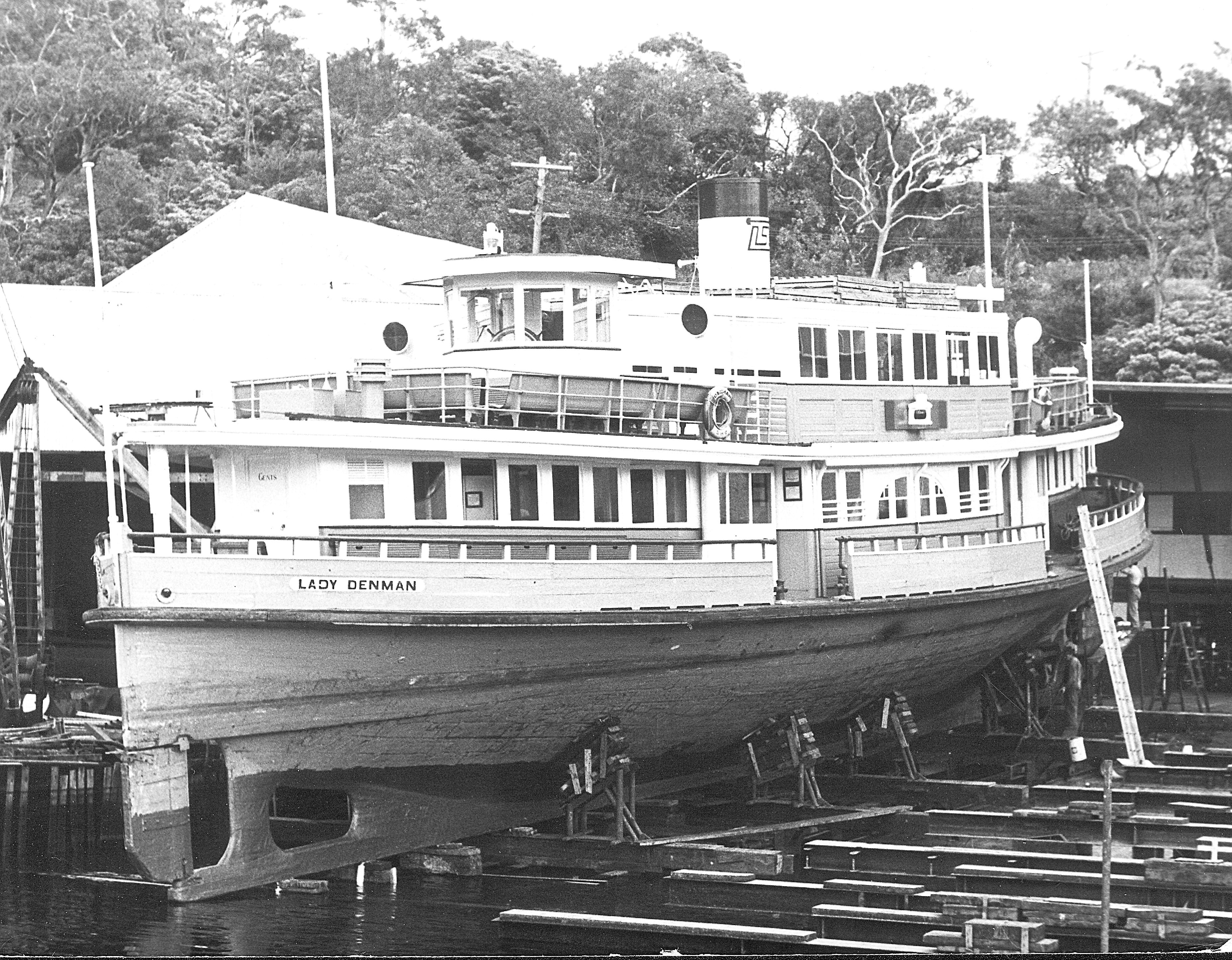
On slips showing her double ended, single propeller configuration

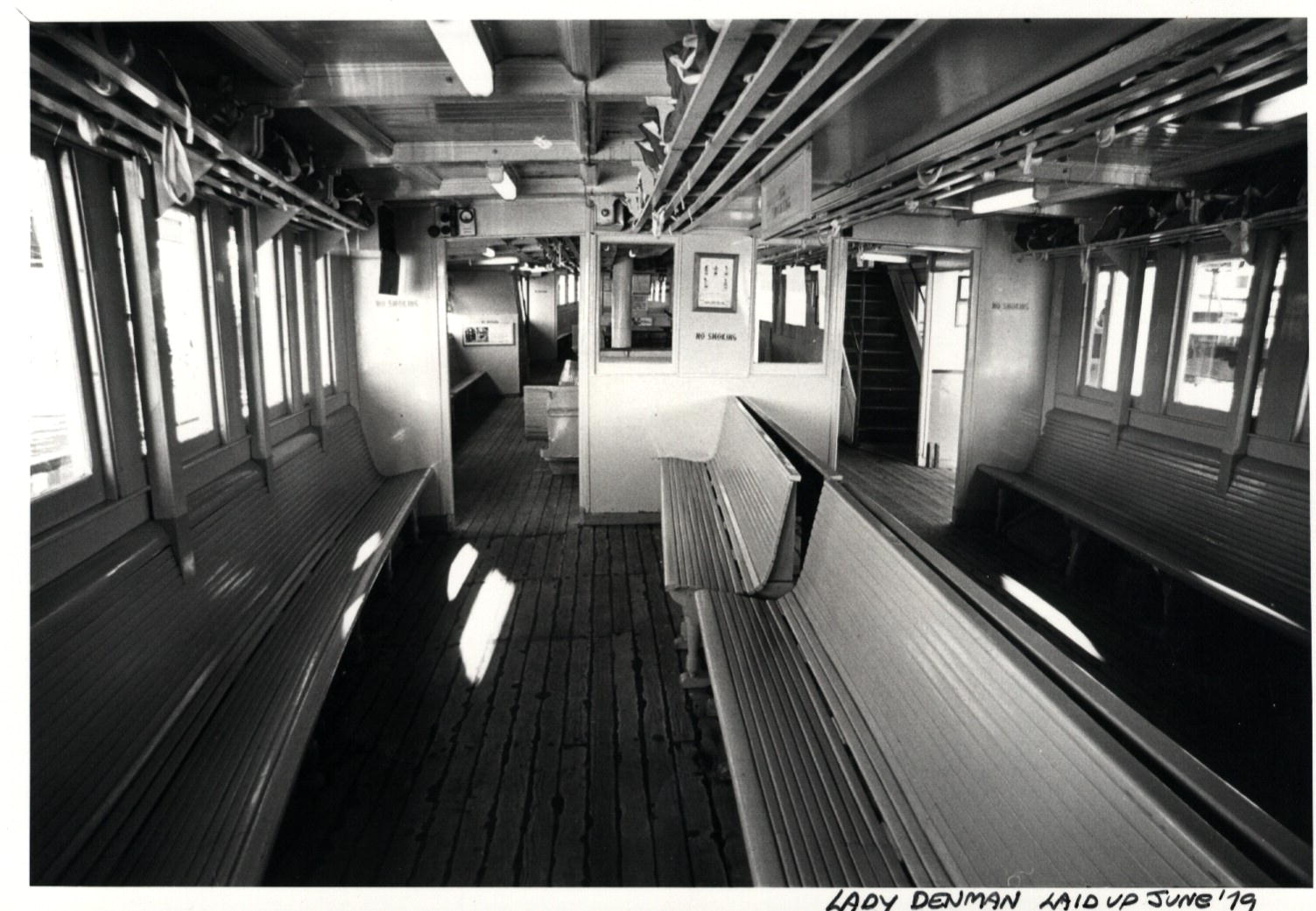
Lower saloon, 1970s

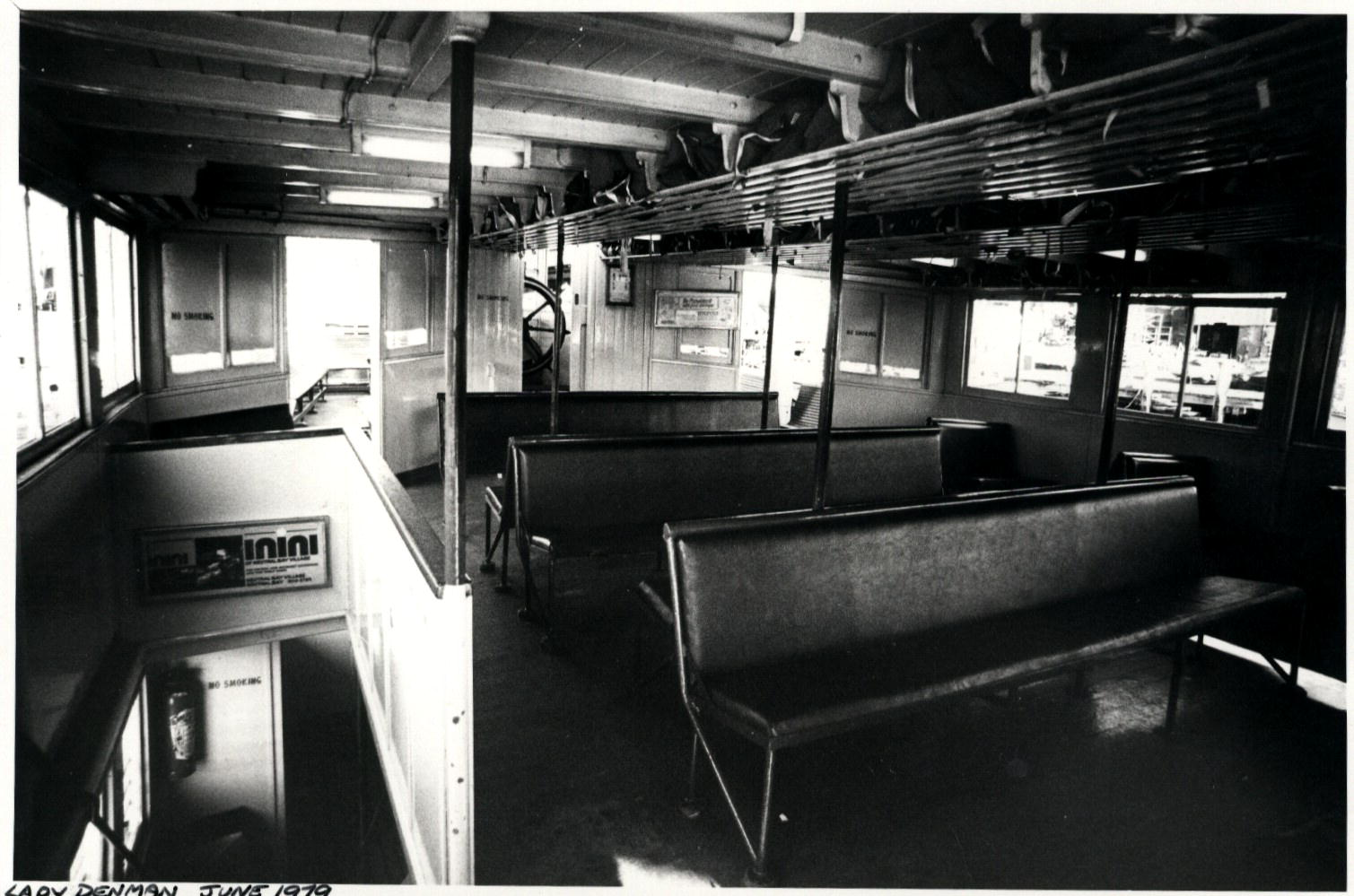
Upper saloon, 1970s

== Pre-Bridge history (1912–1932) ==
From 1900, the Balmain New Ferry Company began a period of expansion to keep up and compete with the tram network expanding into what is now referred to as Sydney's Inner West. Older ferries were sold off and several series of "Lady-class" ferries were introduced.

Lady Denman was the second of five in the Balmain company's final series of "Lady-class" ferries, the others being Ladies Chelmsford (1910), Edeline (1913), Ferguson (1914) and Scott (1914). This series was introduced to replace the single-ended ferries on the Lane Cove River service. They also worked on the run from Balmain to Erskine Street wharf (at site of the current Barangaroo development).

Lady Denman, and the rest of the Balmain fleet, were bought by Sydney Ferries Limited as part of its take over of the Balmain company on 1 March 1918. The five operated the Lane Cove River services to Fig Tree until 12 November 1931 when weekday services were suspended. They ran weekend services to Fig Tree on weekends until 2 September 1945. Lane Cove River services were discontinued altogether on 10 November 1950, after which the five saw them work the Parramatta River and across other routes. Sydney Ferries Ltd ran a service to Balmain until it was taken over in 1939 by Nicholson Brothers Harbour Transport Company with their own ferries. The five "Lady class" ferries were run on other routes across the harbour.

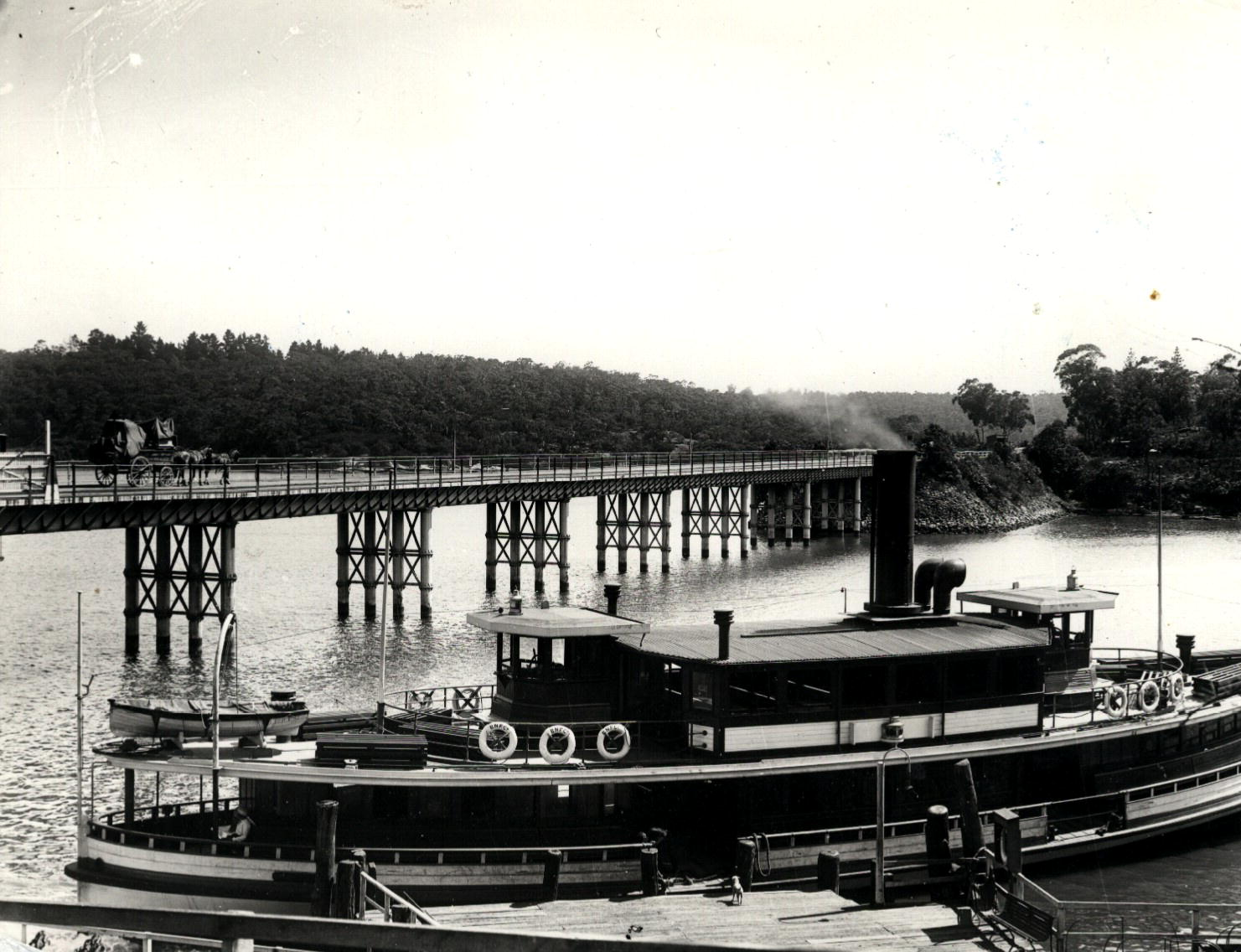
At Fig Tree depot circa 1915

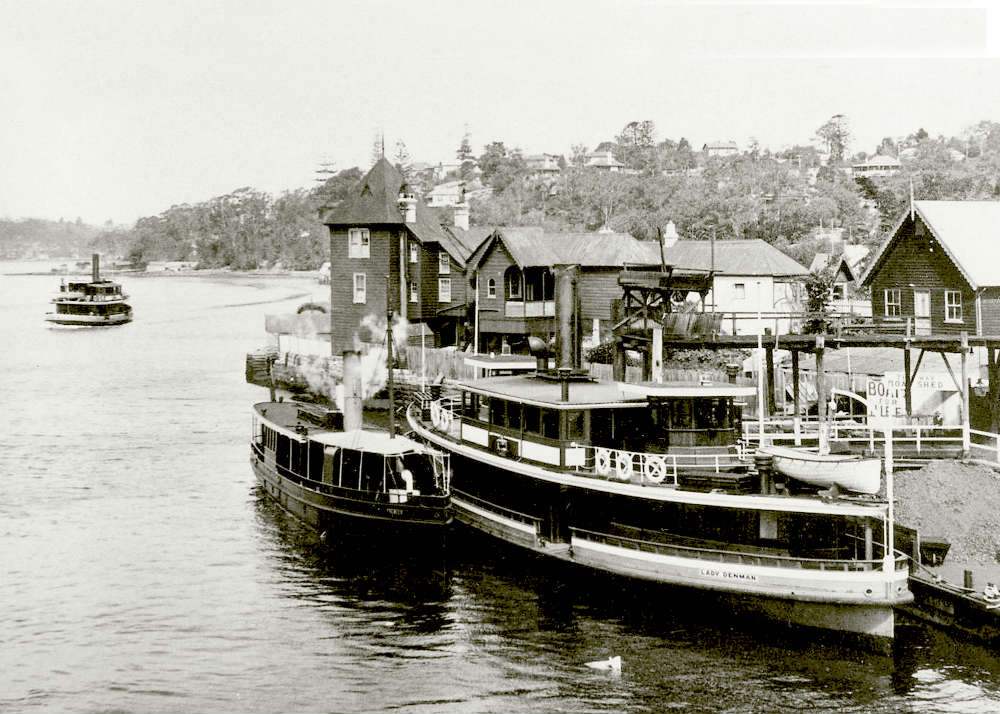
At Fig Tree depot on the Lane Cove River, 1925

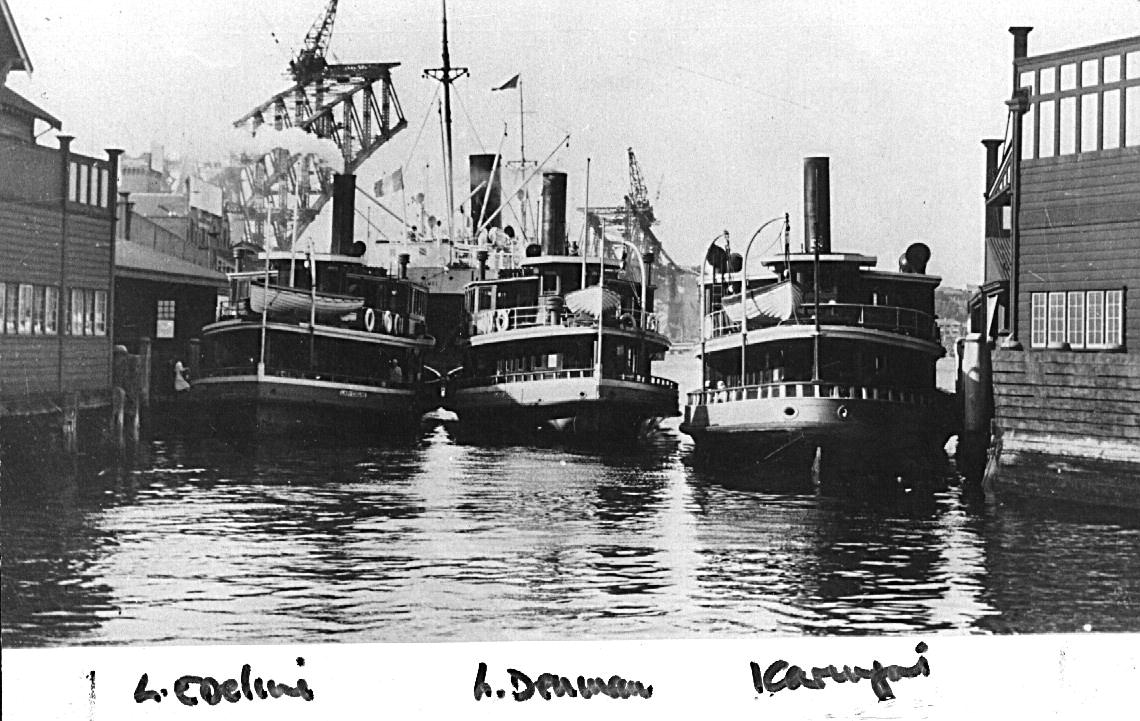
With Lady Edeline and Karingal at Circular Quay as the Sydney Harbour Bridge nears completion, 1930

== Post-Bridge history (1932–1979) ==
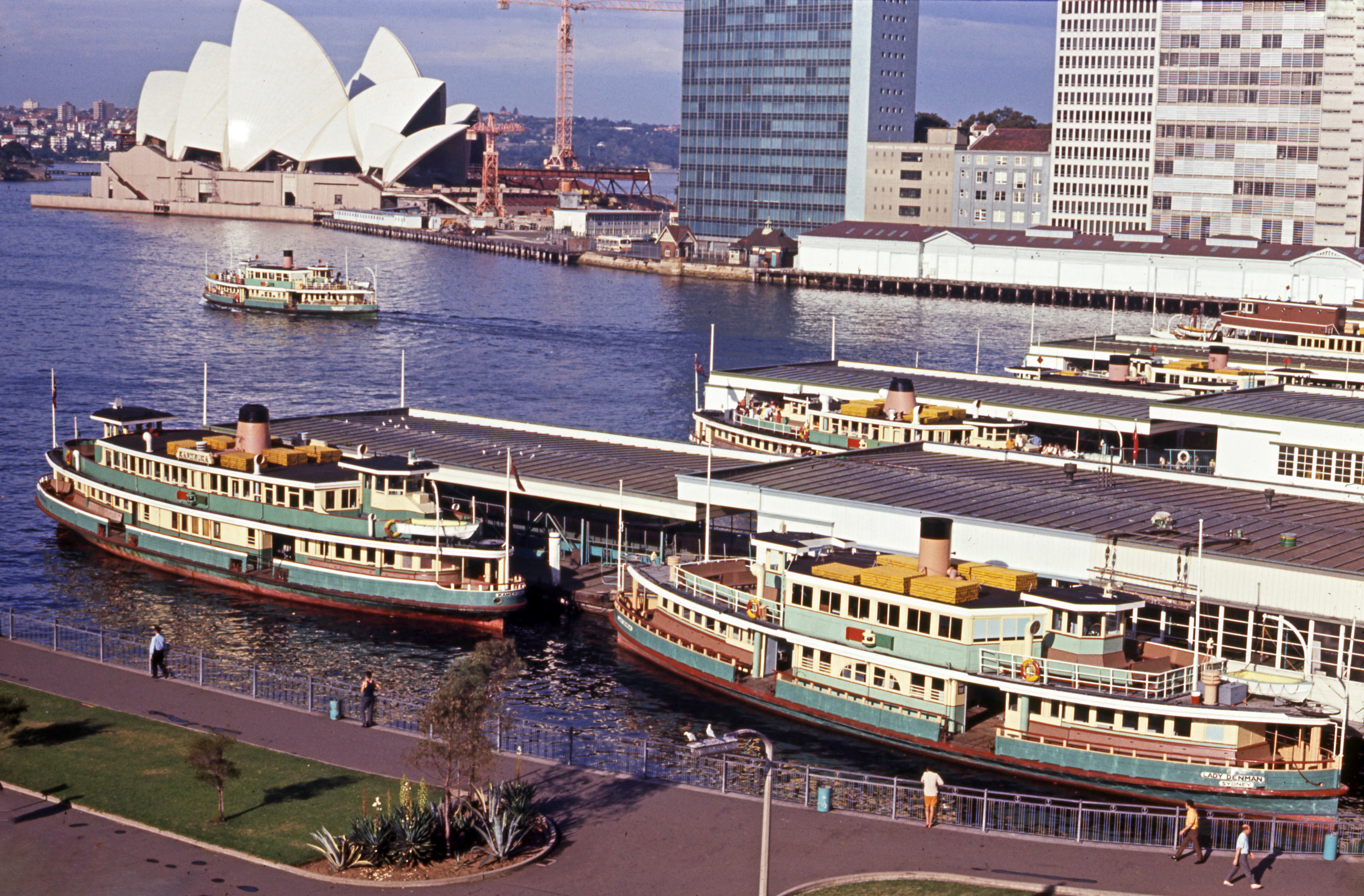
As a NSW Government ferry, alongside Kameruka at Circular Quay, 1970

In 1932, the Sydney Harbour Bridge was opened, and Sydney Ferries Limited's annual patronage dropped from 40 million to about 15 million. As part of economy measures, older and/or most of the larger steamers were put up for sale. The five "Lady-class" ferries, however, were kept in service and converted to diesel power in the 1930s with Lady Chelmsford first. Their tall black smoke stacks were replaced with short funnels. Facing uncertain post-Bridge times, Sydney Ferries Ltd sought a refreshed look for their ferries, covering the original livery of varnished timber and white trim with yellow and green paint and red trim. In 1936, Lady Denman re-entered service with a six-cylinder 170 kW (228 bhp) L. Gardner and Sons diesel. The five "Lady" ferries continued to run the Hunters Hill and Balmain services.

The post-Bridge drop in demand for the ferry fleet was somewhat mitigated as many could not afford their own transport in the Great Depression of the 1930s and rationing of fuel during World War 2 made the coal required for the steam ferries relatively cheap. After the cessation of the Lane Cover River runs, Lady Denman and her sisters ran services to Cockatoo Island during World War II.

However, the post World War II years saw the drop in demand pick up pace. In 1951, with annual patronage down to 9 million, the NSW State Government took over Sydney Ferries Limited and its remaining fleet and assets. The Port Jackson and Manly Steamship Company, which ran the Manly service, was paid to run the services. The services and fleet were quickly rationalised with most of the larger remaining timber K-class steamers being decommissioned, however, the five relatively small and economical "Lady-class" ferries were retained. Throughout the remainder of the 1950s and into the 1960s, they became the back-bone of Sydney Harbour's non-Manly ferry fleet, along with Karingal and Karrabee the smallest of the K-class ferries. Their routes were expanded to all inner-harbour (ie, non-Manly) services including Taronga Park Zoo, Milsons Point, Cremorne and Hunters Hill.

The five sister ferries (except Lady Scott) were re-engined again in the late 1950s and early 1960s. Lady Denman received a 4-cylinder 224 kW (300 bhp) Crossley Brothers diesel.

On 21 April 1951, Lady Denman's engines failed and she ran aground at Cremorne Point. Passengers were transferred to Karingal which then towed Lady Denman off the rocks. On 29 August 1965, she ran aground near Shark Island. Her passengers donned life jackets and rehearsed speeches which invoked the Titanic.

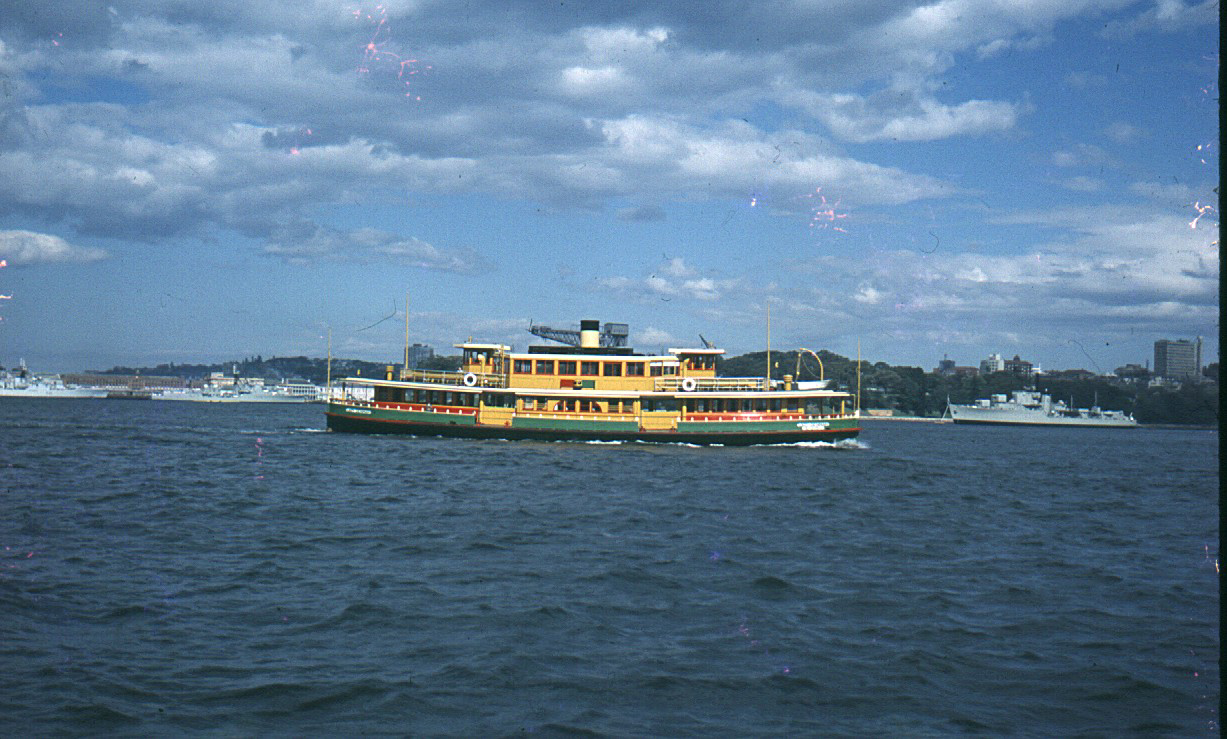
in her 1930s yellow and green colour scheme, September 1962

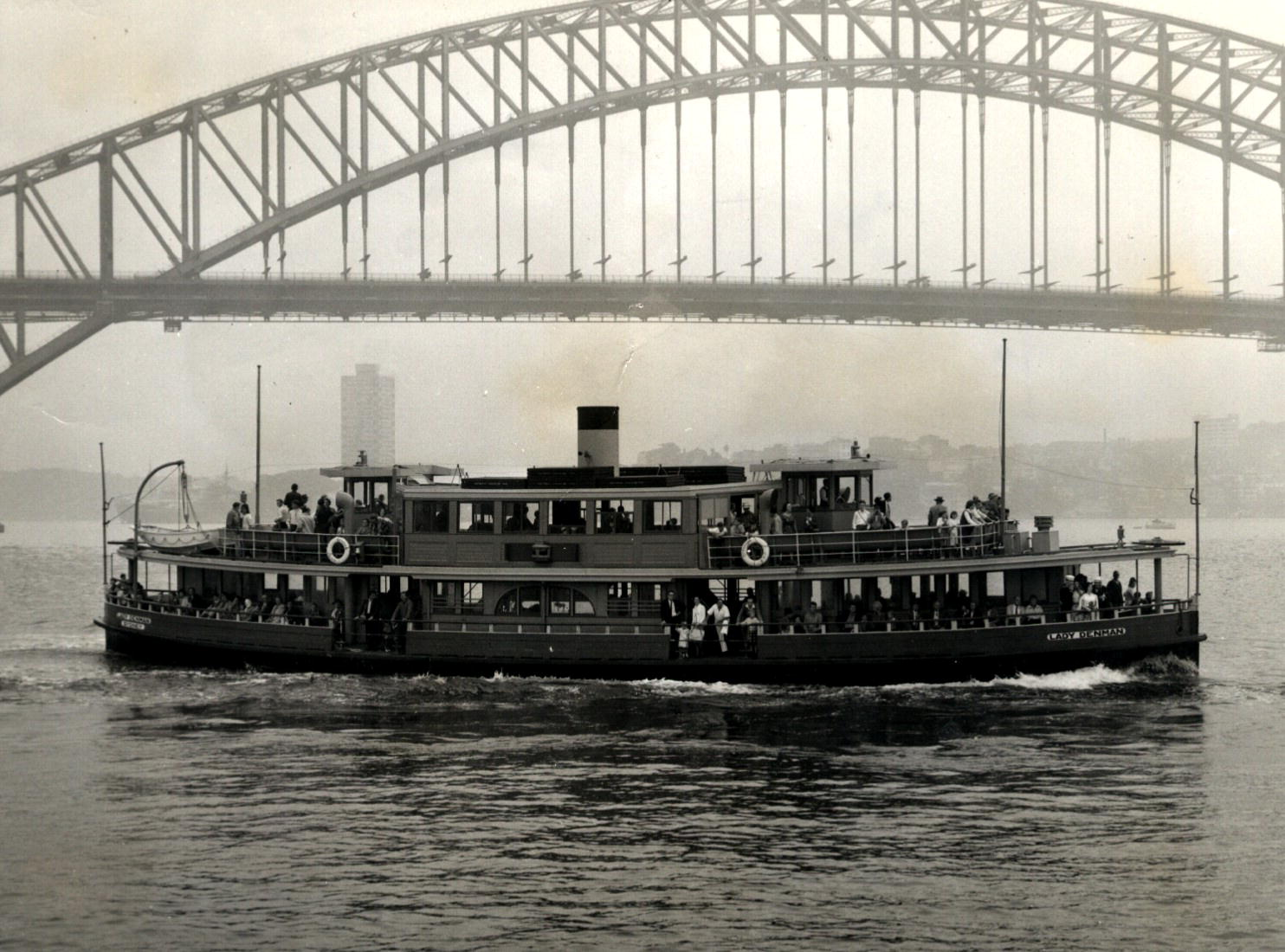
As a diesel vessel, likely 1960s

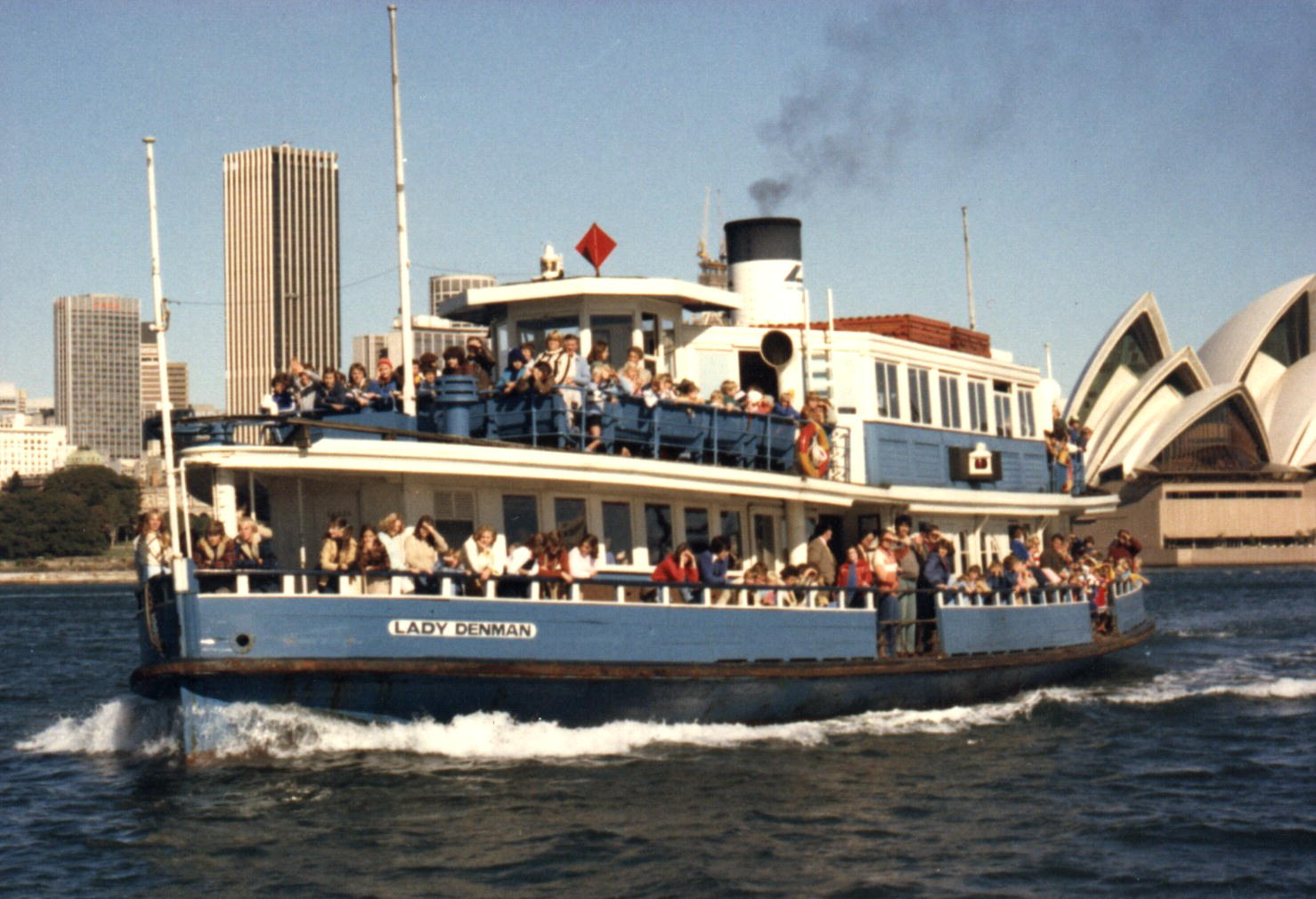
in her Public Transport Commission colours headed for Taronga Zoo, 1975

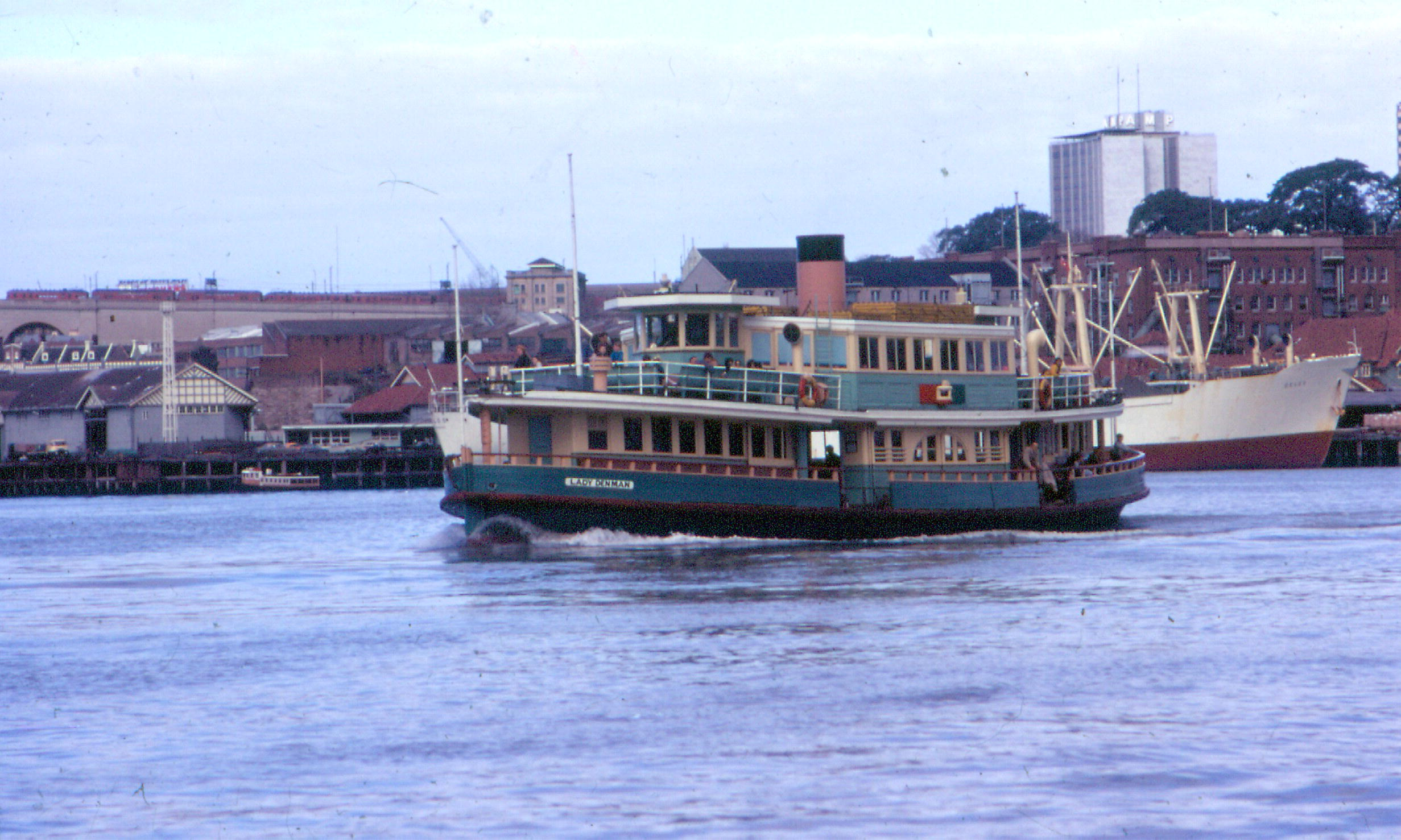
Making her way up from Darling Harbour, 1970

== Liveries ==
As built, she was painted white and maroon with black funnel and varnished timber features. Upon her 1936 conversion to diesel, at a time when Sydney Ferries Limited as seeking a refreshed look for their ferries in the uncertain post-Harbour Bridge times, she and the rest of the fleet was painted in yellow and green with red trim. In the 1960s the NSW government Transport Board updated all their ferries to a more muted cream and khaki scheme. In the 1970s, the fleet were painted in the Public Transport Commission's blue and white scheme.

== Retirement ==
Lady Denman was pulled from ferry service in 1979 following the introduction that year of the new Lady Street. Her last run was on 14 June 1979.

Lady Chelmsford, the first built of the five, was sold in 1969 and rebuilt as a show boat in Adelaide. She was sold to Melbourne interests in 1985 where she was used as a cruise boat. She sank at her moorings in 2008 and was broken up in 2011. Lady Scott was sold out of ferry service in 1969 and used as a cruise ferry. A 1972 fire destroyed her superstructure and she was rebuilt as the John Cadman and undertook a successful career as a cruise boat before being sold in 2000s and falling into disrepair and broken up in 2014. By the 1970s, Lady Ferguson was being used as a spare ferry on Sydney Harbour and set aside for sale in 1974. She was towed to Hobart with Kosciusko in 1975 to assist following the collapse of the Tasman Bridge however she was found to be in too poor condition and was scrapped. Lady Edeline was the longest serving as a Sydney ferry being decommissioned in 1984 with the remaining wooden K-class ferries following the Karrabee's sinking earlier that year. She was laid up on the Parramatta River and sank into the mud in 1988. Of the original five, only Lady Denman is extant.

== Preservation ==
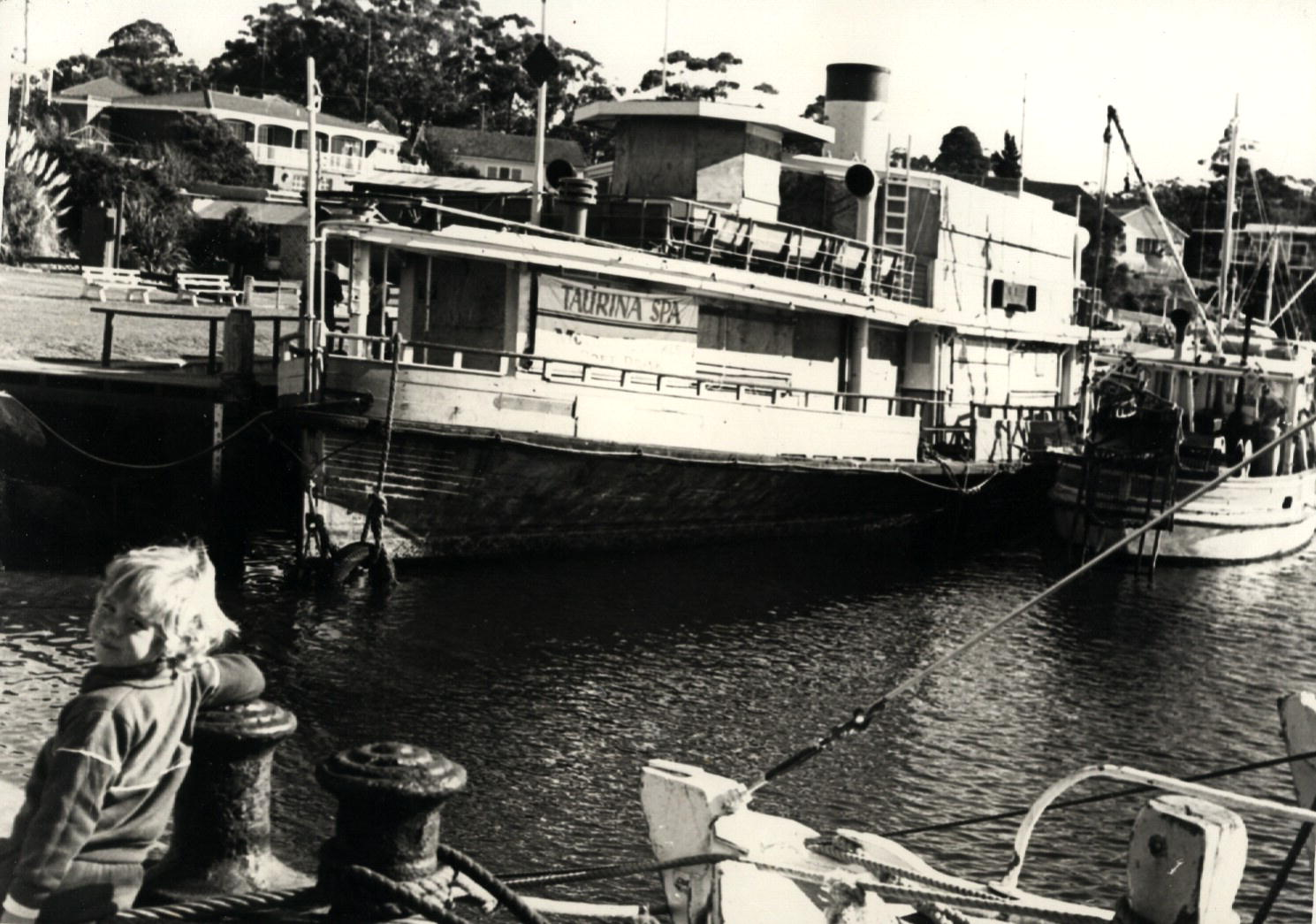
Arrival at Huskisson, 1981

A group from Huskisson led by Member for South Coast John Hatton convinced the Public Transport Commission to donate Lady Denman as a museum piece for display in Huskisson. It was towed out of Sydney Harbour by HMAS Snipe on 3 January 1980, but was quickly damaged by rough seas and had to turn back.

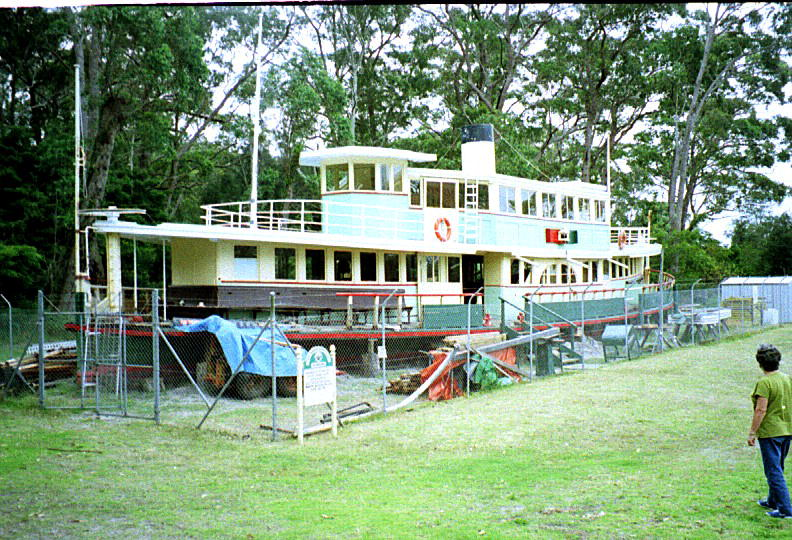
At Huskisson before she was enclosed, 1999

A second attempt was made on 1 June 1981. However, after running into storm off Wollongong, the ferry began taking on water after a pump failure. The Royal Australian Navy were able to provide HMAS Tobruk to shelter the ferry and the tow was successfully completed to Jervis Bay, although at the end of the journey she nearly sank in Currambene Creek at Huskisson, opposite where she had been built.

On 3 April 1983, Lady Denman was hauled ashore to its final resting place very close to where it had been built and restoration work commenced. With a $1.4 million Federal Government grant, on 3 December 1988 the Lady Denman Maritime Museum (since renamed Jervis Bay Maritime Museum) opened. A dry dock was built and a channel cut to where the vessel was sitting, a short distance away and well out of the water. The dock and channel were then flooded, and with pumps operating a patched up LADY DENMAN was floated a pulled by volunteers the short distance across to its new location. The water was then drained out, and construction of its new housing began around it in 1998. Restoration and rebuilding work continue to bring her back to her 1960s appearance. The Museum is divided into three sections, each with its own official openings. Olympian Dawn Fraser opened the Local History Museum, sailor Kay Cottee opened the Museum of Science & the Sea (Halloran Collection) and elder Marjorie Timbery (dec) opened Timbery’s Aboriginal Workshop.

She was added to the New South Wales State Heritage Register on 9 November 2001. The condition of the ferry was reported as good as at 2 June 1998 as a result of conservation work, arresting a long period of deterioration. Its machinery has been removed for separate display and the ferry otherwise remains in its decommissioned state.

== Heritage listing ==
MV Lady Denman
- Location within New South Wales Location within Australia
- 35.0340°S 150.6674°E
- Location: Dent Street, Huskisson, City of Shoalhaven, New South Wales, Australia

History
- Built: 1911–1912

Site notes
- Architect: Walter Reeks
- Owner: Lady Denman Heritage Complex Huskisson Inc.

New South Wales Heritage Register
- Official name: Lady Denman (M.V.); Sydney ferry; M.V. "Lady Denman"
- Type: state heritage (movable / collection)
- Designated: 9 November 2001
- Reference no.: 1518
- Type: Vessel – harbour & river
- Category: Transport – Water
- Builders: Joseph Dent

MV Lady Denman was listed on the New South Wales State Heritage Register on 9 November 2001 having satisfied the following criteria.

The New South Wales Heritage Register The ship is a rare surviving example of the characteristic type of ferryboat which served Sydney Harbour over more than a century, having a long (67 year) association with Sydney Harbour. It is strongly associated in the minds of Sydneysiders and past Sydney visitors with the image of Sydney as a harbour city. It is one of only two surviving traditional wooden Inner Harbour Ferries. It is also a rare surviving example of the design work of Walter Reeks, an innovative and pioneering Australian naval architect. Being the last remaining ferry built in Huskisson, it is strongly associated with Huskisson as a place of manufacture and a fine example of the timber shipbuilding industry, as well as being a significant relic of South Coast family timber ship building industry.

The place is important in demonstrating the course, or pattern, of cultural or natural history in New South Wales.

A rare surviving example of the characteristic type of ferryboat which served Sydney Harbour over more than a century. A rare surviving example of the design work of Walter Reeks, an innovative and pioneering Australian naval architect.

The last remaining ferry built in Huskisson, in service for 67 years and one of two surviving traditional wooden Inner Harbour Ferries. Significant relic of South Coast family ship building industry.

The only Sydney Harbour ferry or Australian commercial vessel to be returned to its place of construction.

The place is important in demonstrating aesthetic characteristics and/or a high degree of creative or technical achievement in New South Wales.

Traditional style of ferry, now virtually unrepresented. Current location amongst spotted gums from which it was built. "From Trees to Seas" theme.

The place has a strong or special association with a particular community or cultural group in New South Wales for social, cultural or spiritual reasons.

One of the longest running Sydney Harbour Ferries, which carried tens of millions of passengers over 67 years, representing era of wooden ferries. Strongly associated in the minds of Sydneysiders and past Sydney visitors with the image of Sydney as a harbour city.

Central exhibit of LDHC, which places wooden ship building in its environment, historical and social context.

The place has potential to yield information that will contribute to an understanding of the cultural or natural history of New South Wales.

Rare evidence of the pioneering design innovations in double ended propulsion undertaken by naval architect Walter Reeks. Preserves construction techniques described by traditional boat builder, Alf Settree in National Trust 1997 Award-winning documentary video, 'From Trees to Seas'

The place possesses uncommon, rare or endangered aspects of the cultural or natural history of New South Wales.

It is the last remaining ferry built in Huskisson. It is one of three surviving traditional wooden larger Sydney Harbour Ferries. It is one of the last two original Lady Class Ferries. It is the only such vessel returned to its place of construction.

The place is important in demonstrating the principal characteristics of a class of cultural or natural places/environments in New South Wales.

It represents the Jervis Bay wooden ship building industry, the Lady class ferries, and Sydney Harbour wooden ferries.

== See also ==
- List of Sydney Harbour ferries
