= Huskisson, New South Wales =

Huskisson
- Town
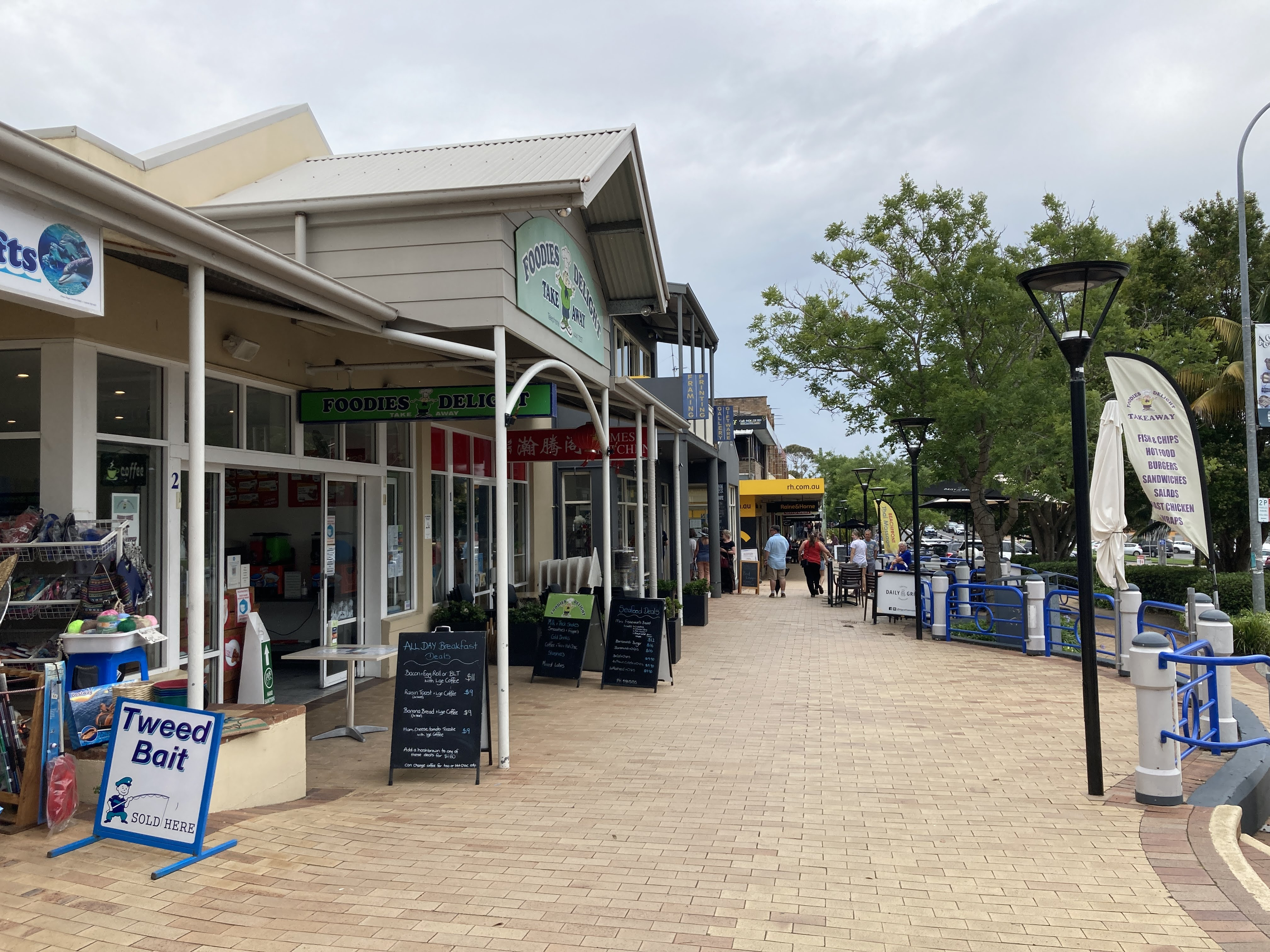
- Shopfronts along Owen Street

- Interactive map of Huskisson
- Coordinates: 35°02′31″S 150°40′17″E
- Country: Australia
- State: New South Wales
- Region: South Coast
- LGA: City of Shoalhaven
- First People: Wandandian
- Location: 186 km (116 mi) S of Sydney; 24 km (15 mi) S of Nowra; 54 km (34 mi) NE of Ulladulla

Government
  - State electorate: South Coast
  - Federal division: Gilmore
- Elevation: 14 m (46 ft)

Population
  - Total: 840 (2021 census)
- Postcode: 2540
- County: St Vincent
- Parish: Currambene
Localities around Huskisson
Falls Creek	Woollamia	Myola
Tomerong	Huskisson	Jervis Bay
Worrowing Heights	Vincentia	Jervis Bay

Huskisson is a village in New South Wales, Australia in the City of Shoalhaven, on the shores of Jervis Bay. It is 24 km (14MI) south-east of Nowra. Despite its relatively low population of 840 as of 2021, it is a tourist town with a relatively large number of shops.

== Etymology ==
Huskisson was named by Governor Sir George Gipps, after the British statesman William Huskisson.

== Geography ==
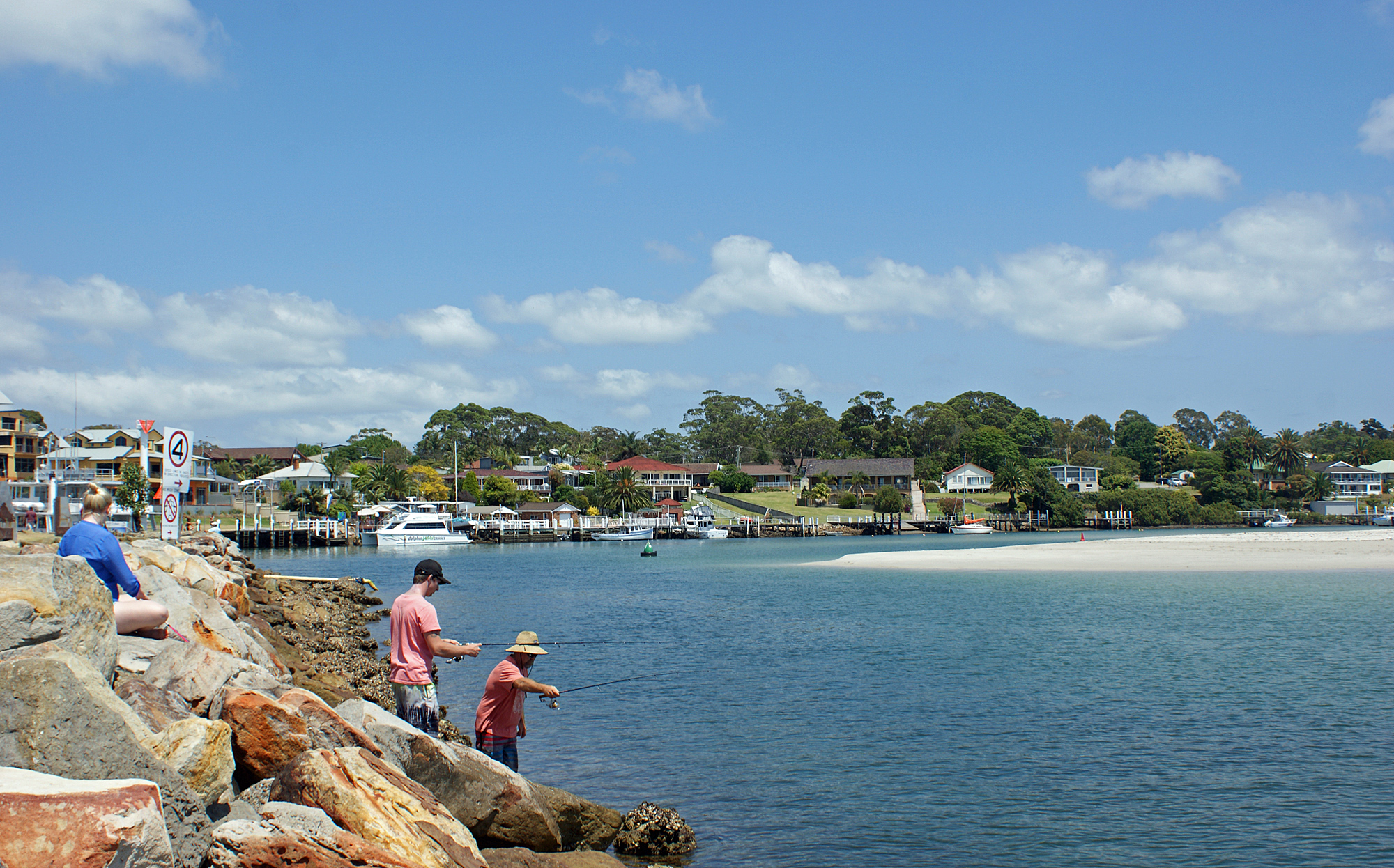
Huskisson sits on the banks of the Currambene Creek

Situated alongside Currambene Creek which also serves as an anchorage and fishing port. Huskisson is a prime tourist destination owing to its white sands and emerald waters (although Hyams Beach to the south is known to have finer white sands).

The town is bounded by Currambene Creek in the north, Moona Moona Creek in the south, the Jervis Bay shoreline and its beaches in the east, and Jervis Bay National Park in the west.

== History ==
=== Aboriginal History ===
The traditional owners of the area around Huskisson are a group of the Yuin. Well into the 20th century, members of what local settlers called 'the Jervis Bay tribe' lived on the bank of Currambene Creek. The 'Jervis Bay tribe' are also known as the Wandandian people, They spoke Dharamba, which was probably the northernmost dialect of the Dhurga language. Huskisson lies very close to the linguistic boundary between the Dharamba dialect and the Thurawal language and the southern end of the traditional lands of the Thurawal people.

=== Origin of Huskisson ===
The origin of Huskisson dates to the early 1840s. The land south of Moona Moona Creek—now Vincentia—was the site of the settlement of South Huskisson, founded in 1841 as a seaport and terminus of The Wool Road. South Huskisson lay on land originally owned by Edward Deas Thompson and was a ‘private town’.

The land to the north of Moona Moona Creek was a ‘government reserve”. When South Huskisson was planned, it was envisaged that the land north of Moona Moona Creek would become a ‘government township’. Allotments were sold both in South Huskisson (in 1841) and in the new 'government township' of Huskisson (in Feb.1843).

South Huskisson was not a success and was in rapid decline by 1850. Consequently, the 'government township' of Huskisson failed to develop. By the mid-1850s, town allotments in both Huskisson and South Huskisson were essentially worthless.

Huskisson only began to grow, when it became the site of shipbuilding in the early 1860s. In its early years, Huskisson was often referred to as ‘North Huskisson’ reverting to Huskisson, once the ruins of its privately owned southern twin town—by then referred to as ‘the Old Township’—had all but disappeared.

=== Shipbuilding ===
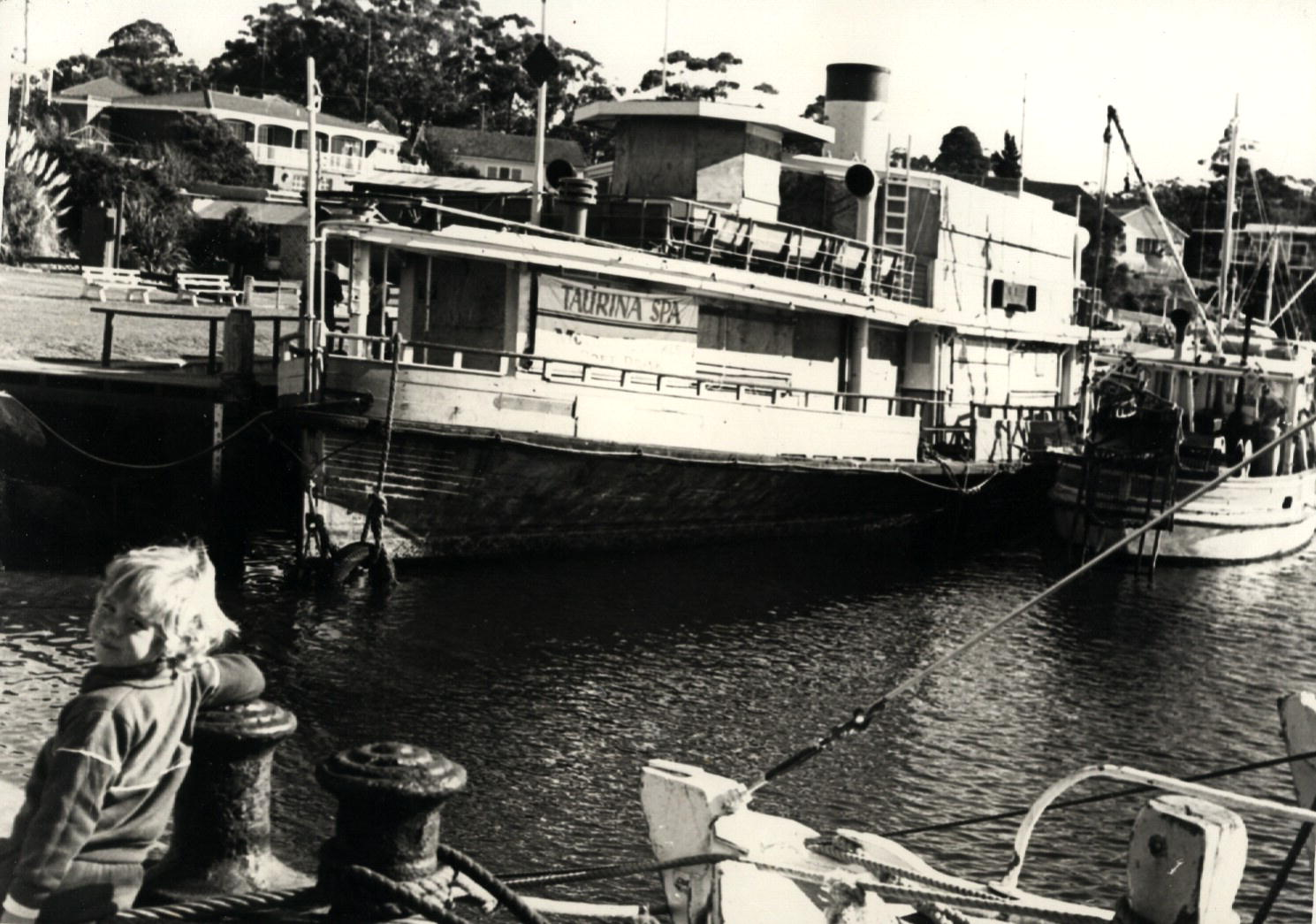
MV Lady Denman was built at the Huskisson shipyards

From 1864 to 1977, at least 131 registered wooden-hulled vessels were built in Huskisson, in shipyards along Currumbene Creek. That number does not include the many unregistered wooden-hulled vessels—such as small boats, punts, barges, and timber lighters—that were also built there during that period.

The shipyards built sailing vessels and steamships, including schooners, tug-boats, island-trading ships—for the firm of W.R. Carpenter & Co., during the 1930s and 1940s—and two passenger ferries for Sydney (Lady Denman in 1911 and Lady Scott in 1914).

Up to the late 1940s, vessels were built using the ‘work frame’ method in which frames were created using timber from natural crooks in trees (not bent using steam as is more common now). Until 1940, the town had no electricity; all vessels were built without power tools, other than a steam-operated saw-mill used to make planks. Timber was locally sourced, generally from within a few miles of the town.

During the Second World War, the Huskisson shipyard built four wooden-hulled vessels for the American Army, for use in the New Guinea campaign. After the war, the old shipbuilding techniques gave way to more modern methods and in later years most vessels built were wooden-hulled fishing trawlers.

The main shipyard owners were, in earlier years, the Dent family, and later the Setree family.

=== Services & Facilities ===
During the early days of the settlement, a post office operated at 'Huskisson', from January 1843 up to the end of December 1855. A post office opened 'North Huskisson' in November 1875, and its first post master was Andrew Mackenzie, eldest son of John Mackenzie. By 1875, the ‘North Huskisson’ school was in operation. A telephone exchange opened in November 1912. In 1940, the town was connected to electricity.

There was a ‘Government Wharf used by the Illawarra Steam Navigation Company.

=== Tourism ===
By the 1890s, Huskisson began to be a holiday destination. The Dent family opened the Jervis Bay Hotel in 1893 and operated guesthouses on the beachfront.

== Demographics ==
At the 2021 census, the population of the State Suburb of Huskisson was 840. 72.0% of people were born in Australia and 83.2% of people spoke only English at home. The most common responses for religion were No Religion 45.6%, Catholic 16.2%. and Anglican 15.0%

== Heritage listings ==
Huskisson has a number of heritage-listed sites, including:

- Dent Street: MV Lady Denman

== Notable people from Huskisson ==
- John Storey, Premier of New South Wales, born in Huskisson
- Olyroos goalkeeper Adam Federici
- Musician and athlete Paul Greene
