= Callala Bay =

- Town
- Wowly Gully in northern Callala Bay

- Coordinates: 35°00′S 150°43′E
- Country: Australia
- State: New South Wales
- Region: South Coast
- LGA: City of Shoalhaven
- Location: 132 km (82 mi) S of Sydney; 16 km (9.9 mi) SE of Nowra

Government
  - State electorate: South Coast
  - Federal division: Gilmore
- Elevation: 13 m (43 ft)

Population
  - Total: 2,196 (2016 census)
- Postcode: 2540
- County: St Vincent
- Parish: Wollumboola
- Mean max temp: 19.9 °C (67.8 °F)
- Mean min temp: 13.6 °C (56.5 °F)
- Annual rainfall: 1,240.9 mm (48.85 in)
Localities around Callala Bay
Wollumboola	Wollumboola	Wollumboola
Callala Beach	Callala Bay	Jervis Bay
Callala Beach	Jervis Bay	Jervis Bay

Callala Bay is a small town on the South Coast of New South Wales, Australia in the City of Shoalhaven.

The town is situated on the northern shore of Jervis Bay about 20 minutes drive from Nowra and 10 minutes from Culburra Beach. Callala Bay has an approximate elevation of 13 metres (43 ft) above sea level, and is located inland from Callala Point, a headland facing the Tasman Sea. Nearby settlements include Callala Beach and Myola to the south-west, Currarong to the south-east and Culburra Beach to the north-east.

Local facilities and community activities include:

- a safe harbour
- jetty
- sailing club
- boat ramp
- medical centre
- primary school
- child care and pre-school centre
- faith groups
- soccer club
- skateboard park
- netball/basketball courts
- community centre (available for hire)
- NSW Rural Fire Service – Callala Bay
- a small shopping centre (Australia Post, supermarket, chemist, baker, butcher, cafe, take away, real estate agents, cellars)
- shared pathway around the headland
- small group activities (aqua exercise group, craft, folk dance, yoga, over 50s' social group, garden club, Writers, Bushcare)
- regular bus service to Nowra, including for high school students.

Profile statistics used by Shoalhaven City Council for planning purposes are located here

== Sport and recreation ==
- Club Callala
- Beachsafe Callala Bay
- Callala Beach Triathlon
- Callala Bay Tennis Court
