= Falls Creek, New South Wales =

Falls Creek
- Town
- Coordinates: 34°58′55″S 150°35′16″E
- Country: Australia
- State: New South Wales
- Region: South Coast
- LGA: City of Shoalhaven
- Location: 181 km (112 mi) S of Sydney; 13 km (8.1 mi) S of Nowra; 14 km (8.7 mi) NW of Huskisson; 51 km (32 mi) N of Ulladulla

Government
  - State electorate: South Coast
  - Federal division: Gilmore
- Elevation: 26 m (85 ft)

Population
  - Total: 939 (2021 census)
- Postcode: 2540
- County: St Vincent
- Parish: Tomerong
Localities around Falls Creek
Parma	Nowra Hill	Comberton
Yerriyong	Falls Creek	Woollamia
Tomerong	Tomerong	Huskisson

Falls Creek is a small town south of Nowra, New South Wales in the Shoalhaven. It is situated on the Princes Highway. In the 2021 census it has a population of 939.
