= Woollamia =

- Suburb
- Coordinates: 35°00′53″S 150°38′21″E
- Country: Australia
- State: New South Wales
- Region: South Coast
- LGA: City of Shoalhaven
- Location: 18 km (11 mi) SE of Nowra; 187 km (116 mi) S of Sydney; 6 km (3.7 mi) NW of Huskisson

Government
  - State electorate: South Coast
  - Federal division: Gilmore

Population
  - Total: 653 (2021 census)
- Postcode: 2540
- County: St Vincent
- Parish: Currambene
Suburbs around Woollamia
Falls Creek	Comberton	Comberton
Falls Creek	Woollamia	Myola
Tomerong	Huskisson	Huskisson

Woollamia is a beach-side locality in the City of Shoalhaven in New South Wales, Australia. It lies about 18 km southeast of Nowra on the western side of Currambene Creek about six km northwest of Huskisson. At the 2021 census, it had a population of 653.
