= Tomerong =

- Town
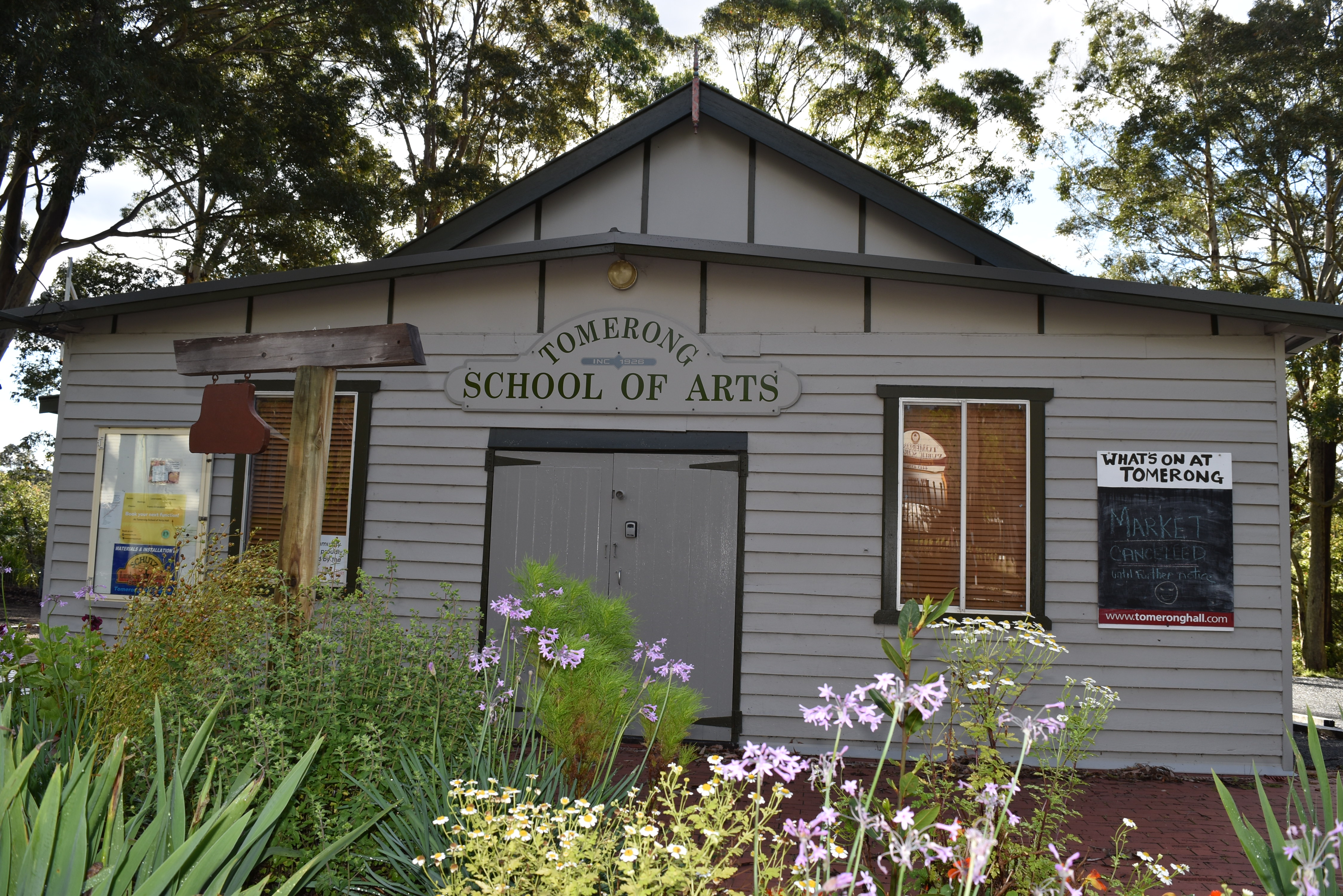
- Tomerong School of Arts in 2021

- Coordinates: 35°04′S 150°35′E
- Country: Australia
- State: New South Wales
- Region: South Coast
- LGA: City of Shoalhaven

Government
  - State electorate: South Coast
  - Federal division: Gilmore

Population
  - Total: 1,194 (2021 census)
- Postcode: 2540
- County: St Vincent
- Parish: Wandrawandian
Localities around Tomerong
Yerriyong	Falls Creek	Huskisson
Yerriyong	Tomerong	Worrowing Heights
Bewong	Basin View	St Georges Basin

Tomerong is a village in the South Coast region of New South Wales, Australia. It is located approximately 180 kilometres by road south from the state capital Sydney and 20 kilometres south of the commercial centre of the City of Shoalhaven, Nowra in the County of St Vincent. The village is eight kilometres inland of the western shores of Jervis Bay and is located at the boundary of the Parish of Tomerong and the Parish of Wandrawandian. Its population at the 2021 census was 1,194. The traditional custodians of this country are the Wandandian (wandi wandian) people of Yuin Country who spoke the Dhurga language.

With a history of farming and sawmilling, the village and its environs is now primarily low to medium density residential, providing easy access to tourist areas such as Huskisson on Jervis Bay and the commercial centre Nowra. West and south west of the village the land is predominantly State Forests and Crown Land adjoined by the Morton National Park.

== History ==
The first recorded European exploration of the area around Tomerong probably occurred when Lieutenant James Grant of the Lady Nelson ventured inland from Jervis Bay up to 13 kilometres in 1801. Land grants occurred around Jervis Bay and St Georges Basin in the 1830s and 1840s with the first Tomerong land sale occurring at Nowra on 8 May 1855. Settlement increased as a bridge was constructed across Falls Creek and the development of the main south coast road provided transport and mail services. The Travellers Rest Hotel was opened in 1857 to service the travelling public and, five years later, a post office and school were established. Both celebrated their 150th (Sesquicentenary) anniversary in 2012. A church was constructed in 1877 and a general store commenced operation about 1882, but it was the development of the timber industry (from 1815 for cedar and from about 1860 for hardwood) that saw Tomerong's importance grow, just as farming had started to wane. For the next 100 years the industry was so important to the village that it resulted in the headquarters of the Clyde Shire being constructed in 1908. A school of arts was constructed in 1926 and remains a popular venue for entertainment, not only for the locals. The consolidation of sawmills saw local enterprises reduce in the 1960s and 1970s and the bypassing of the village in 1995 by the Princes Highway meant the village became more attractive for family living adjacent to the growth areas of St Georges Basin and Huskisson/Vincentia.

== Contemporary Tomerong ==
Since the last sawmill closed in the mid 1980s and the main south coast road bypassed in 1995, the village, whilst quieter, has increased in population and dwellings. Its precinct (now Hawken Road) is still dominated by the school of arts, public school, post office, church and the volunteer Rural Fire Service] building. The school of arts has a busy patronage with private and community events. A new Rural Fire Service building was opened in 1991 opposite the Union Church that, whilst undergoing major repairs in 2000s, has seen little use since 1993. The public school was the subject of a major building program in 1995 and remains the major employer in the village. Volunteer organisations are an important part of village life with members active in P&C, Rural Fire Service, the Forum (a Community Consultative Body active with the local council) and the school of arts. Other bodies have been organised as required; such as the Friends of Tomerong Union Church, that organised the church's restoration; the Shoalhaven Unwanted Tip] Campaign (ShUT), that successfully lobbied to prevent a local shale quarry from being used as a non-putrescible waste dump; and the Sesquicentenary Committee that organised the primary school's 150th celebrations in 2012.

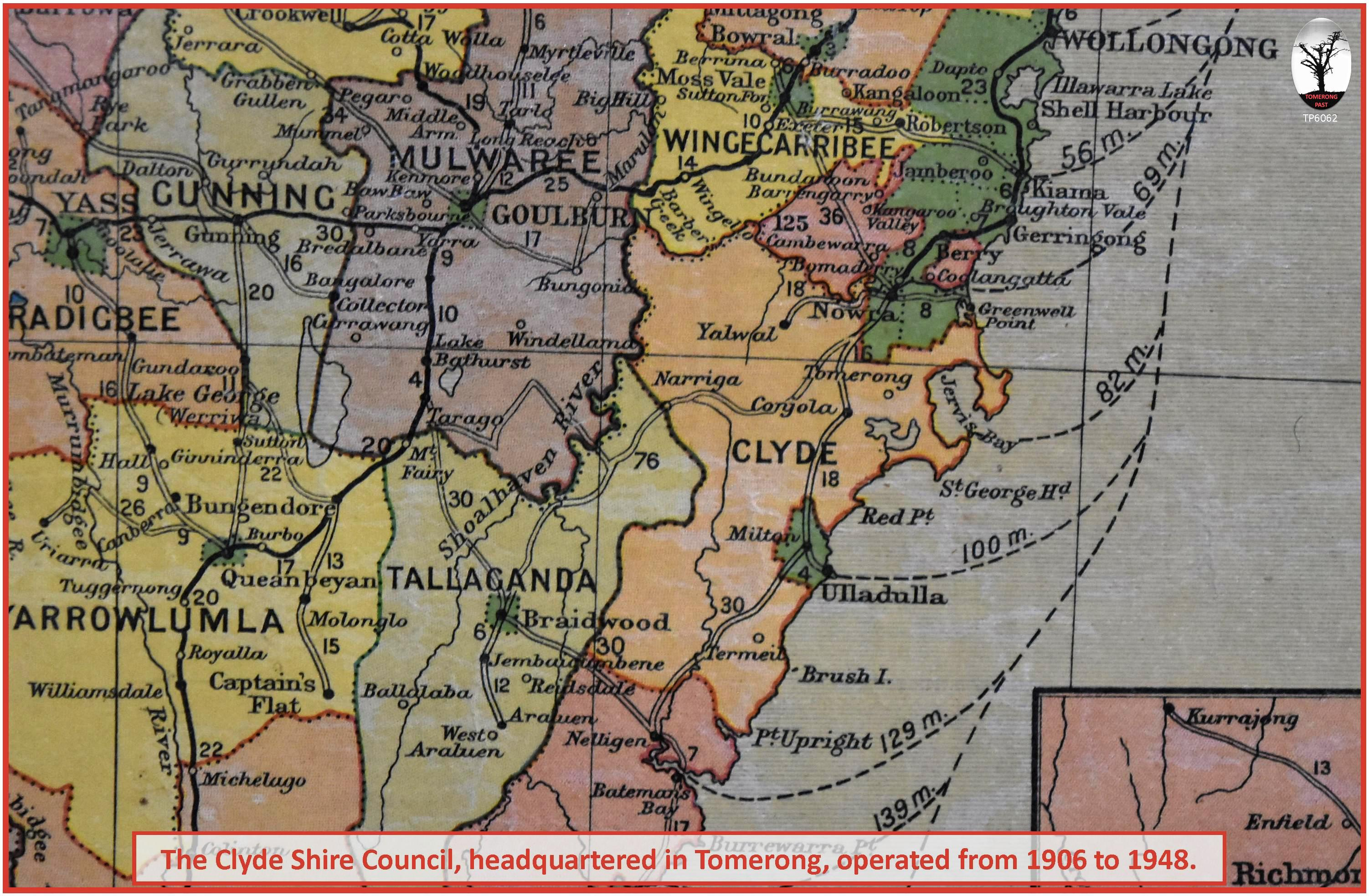
Clyde Shire Map

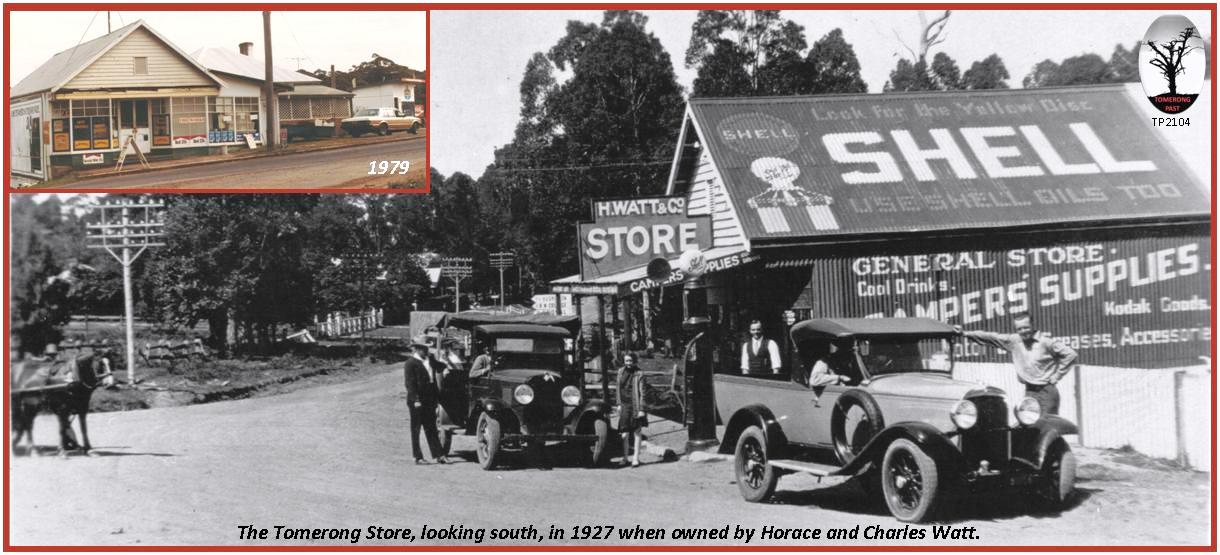
Tomerong General Store in 1927

== Geography and climate ==
The village is 48 metres above sea level and is overlooked to the north by Tomerong Hill at 111 metres. The settlement is concentrated on a north to south spur of this hill which runs two kilometres down to Tomerong Creek 20 metres above sea level. A ridgeline, of about 100 metres above sea level, located two kilometres west of the village runs generally north to south. Creeks north east of the village generally drain to Currambene Creek and Jervis Bay, whilst those to the south generally run to St Georges Basin. The village lies near the southern extremity of the Sydney Basin with the higher areas to the north and west comprising Nowra Sandstone that thins to the south and east to reveal Wandrawandian Siltstone. Average minimum and maximum temperatures in degrees Celsius and average rainfall in millimetres are shown in the following table.

	Jan	Feb	Mar	Apr	May	Jun	Jul	Aug	Sep	Oct	Nov	Dec
Min Temp	16.0	16.3	15.2	12.8	10.1	8.1	6.7	6.8	8.0	10.5	12.8	14.4
Max Temp	25.6	25.7	24.5	22.0	18.5	16.5	15.4	16.7	18.5	20.7	22.7	24.6
Rainfall	102	153	123	87	60	99	61	78	59	130	105	96
