= Yerriyong =

- Suburb
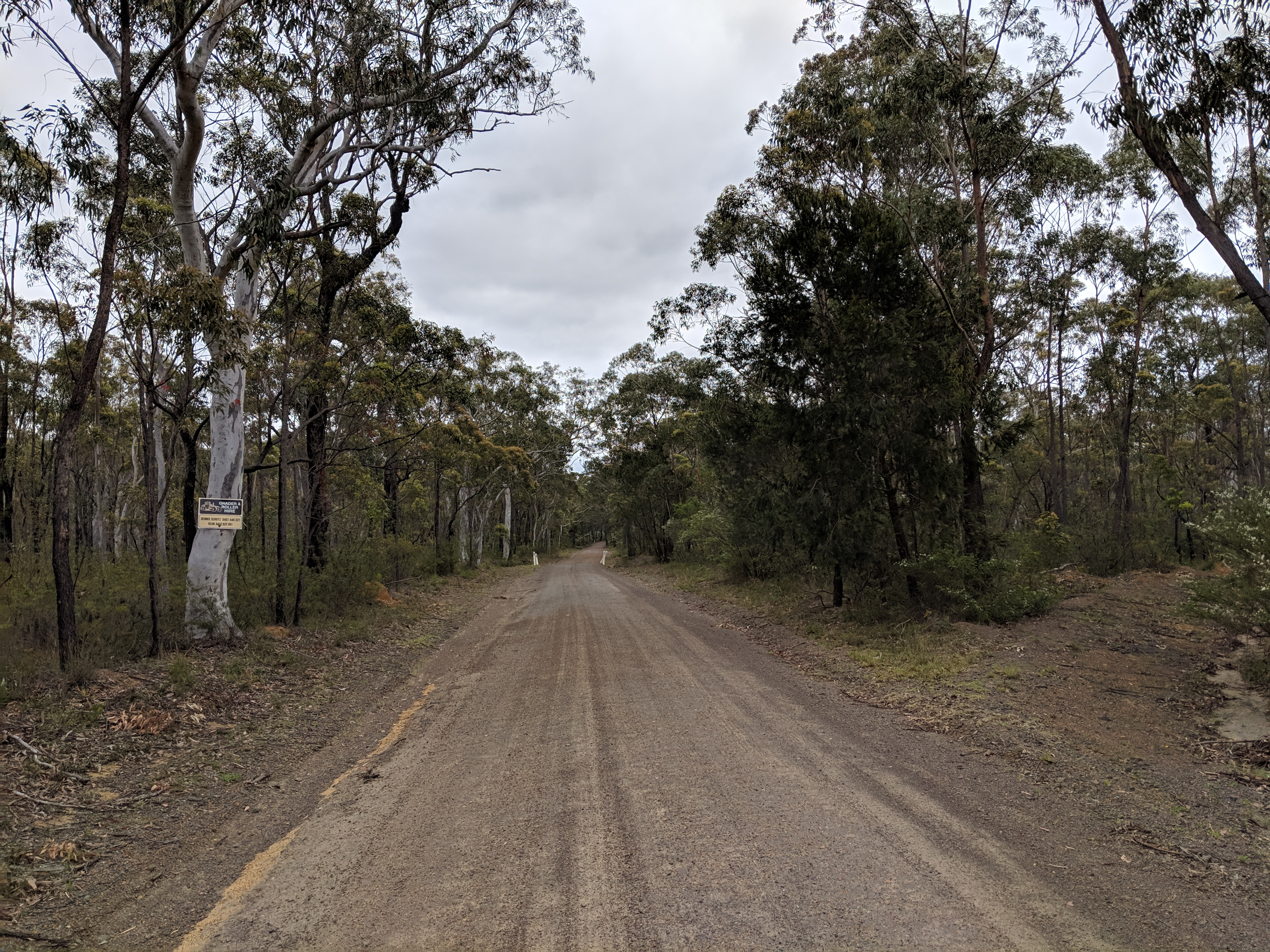
- Road in Yerriyong

- Coordinates: 34°59′36″S 150°29′05″E
- Country: Australia
- State: New South Wales
- Region: South Coast
- LGA: City of Shoalhaven
- Location: 187 km (116 mi) S of Sydney; 17 km (11 mi) SW of Nowra; 126 km (78 mi) ESE of Goulburn

Government
  - State electorate: Kiama
  - Federal division: Gilmore
- Elevation: 240 m (790 ft)

Population
  - Total: 46 (SAL 2021)
- Postcode: 2540
- County: St Vincent
- Parish: Yerriyong
Suburbs around Yerriyong
Barringella	Barringella	Parma
Yalwal	Yerriyong	Falls Creek
Boolijah	Jerrawangala	Tomerong

Yerriyong is a locality in the City of Shoalhaven in New South Wales, Australia. It lies about 17 km to the southwest of Nowra on the road to Nerriga and Canberra. It is largely made up of eucalyptus forest.

The name is believed to be of Aboriginal origin, as in Tharawal "Yerri" means "tooth" and "ong" is a common place name ending, so it is considered to relate to an initiation ceremony.

Yerriyong had a state school from 1885 to 1948. This was described as a "provisional school" (October 1882–April 1883), "public school" (1883–1895), or "half-time school" (June–September 1895). It was replaced by Yerriyong Vale, which was a "half-time school" (June–September 1895, 1906–1908 and 1914–1916) or a "provisional school" (1895–1906 and 1909–1913).

== Demographics ==
At the 2016 census, Yerriyong had a population of 25, which had increased to 46 at the 2021 census.
