= Currarong, New South Wales =

Currarong
- Town
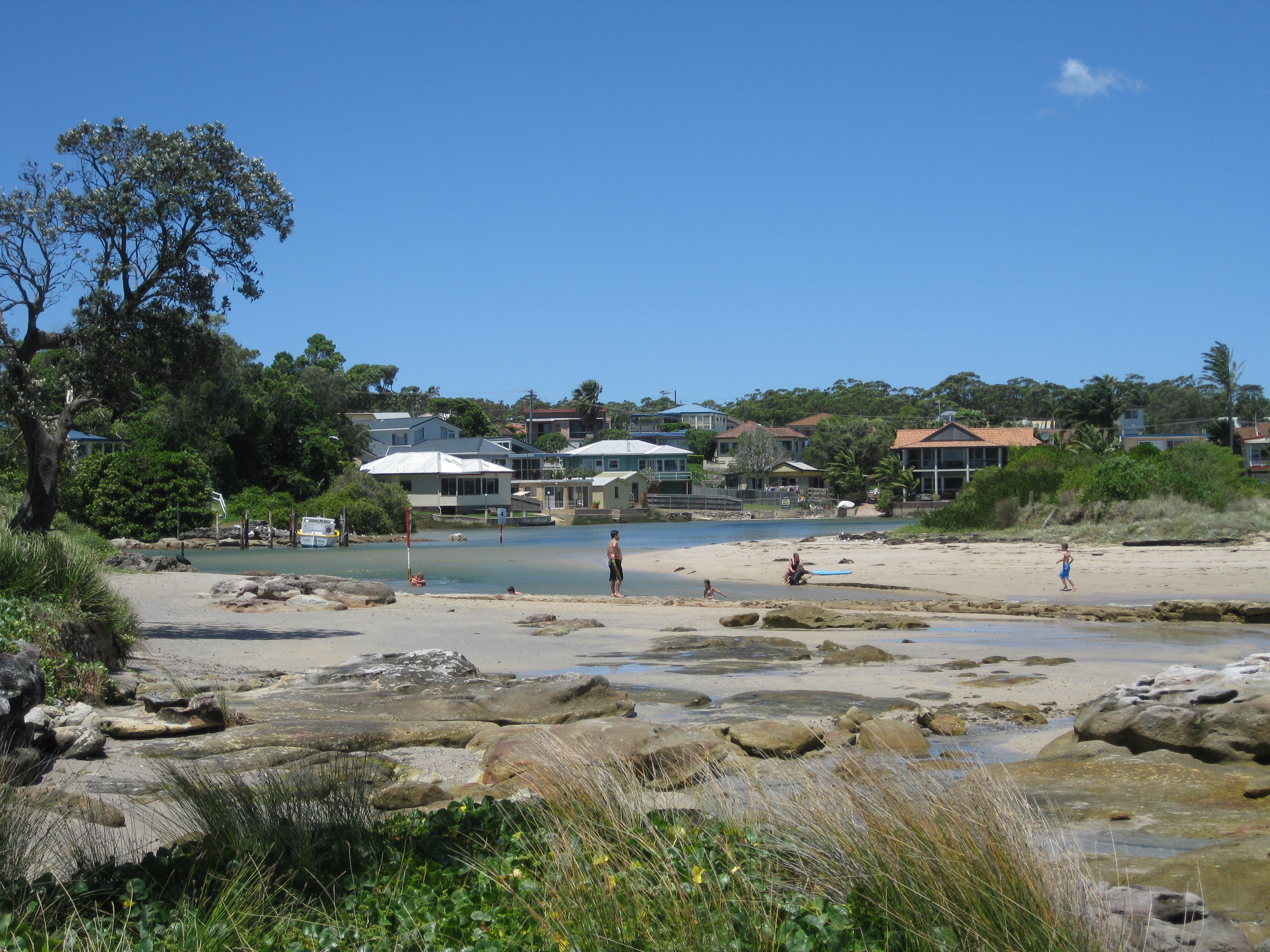
- Currarong Inlet

- Coordinates: 35°01′03″S 150°49′21″E
- Country: Australia
- State: New South Wales
- LGA: City of Shoalhaven
- Location: 193 km (120 mi) S of Sydney; 112 km (70 mi) S of Wollongong; 33 km (21 mi) SE of Nowra

Government
  - State electorate: South Coast
  - Federal division: Gilmore

Population
  - Total: 479 (2021 census)
- Postcode: 2540

Currarong is a small coastal fishing and tourist village of 556 houses in the Shoalhaven area of New South Wales, Australia. At the 2021 census, Currarong had a permanent population of 479 (occupying 38 percent of dwellings). The village is a haven for fishermen, with several underwater rises where fish are abundant.

== Beaches ==
Currarong is surrounded by 14 white sand beaches, most notable are Warrain Beach and sheltered Abrahams Bosom beach. Currarong is also known for its rock pool, the beaches and cliffs off the walking tracks around the Beecroft peninsula, and for the many protected beaches a few minutes drive away on the other side of the headland in Jervis Bay, including Long Beach, Cabbage Tree Beach and the horse-shoe shaped Honeymoon Bay.

== Fishing and diving ==
Currarong has world class fishing - rock, beach and ocean. A spot down the cliff from Point Perpendicular is one of the few land based locations in Australia where Yellow Fin Tuna and Marlin can be caught. In 2011 a new boat ramp was completed that allows for launching two boats at a time. The area is also renowned for its scuba diving and snorkelling.

== Sights ==
The wreck of the SS Merimbula is about 15 minutes walk. The freighter, belonging to the Illawarra Steam Navigation Company was wrecked on the Beecroft Headland in 1928. All passengers and crew were rescued. The historic Point Perpendicular lighthouse is a 10-minute drive.

Currarong is one of the few places in NSW where the sun set over the ocean.

Whales migrate along the coastline in season and dolphins cruise the waters of the bay every day.

== In literature ==
Currarong appears in Kylie Tennant's 1946 novel "Lost Haven".

Esteemed character actor Aidan Bjorngaard, while playing ethnically ambiguous schoolboy 1 in episode 23, season 15 of "Home and Away" can be heard saying "If loving you is Currawrong, I don't want to be Curraright" in an outtake in the VHS directors cut.
