= Department of Infrastructure and Regional Development =

Australian government department, 2013–2017

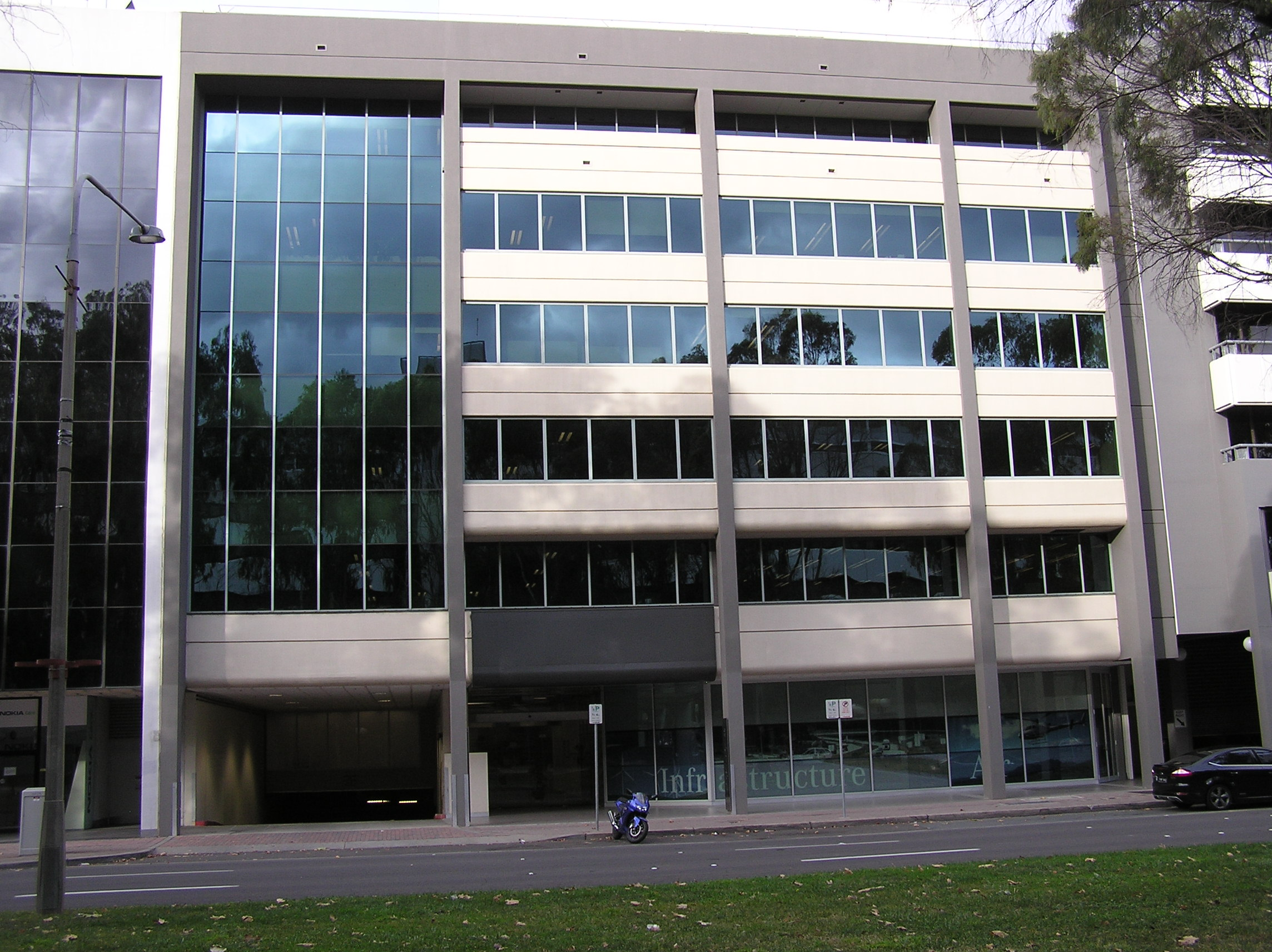
- The building at 62 Northbourne Avenue in Canberra, which housed part of the Department of Infrastructure and Regional Development.

Department overview
- Formed: 18 September 2013
- Preceding agencies: Department of Infrastructure and Transport; Department of Regional Australia, Local Government, Arts and Sport
- Dissolved: 20 December 2017
- Superseding Department: Department of Infrastructure, Regional Development and Cities
- Jurisdiction: Commonwealth Government
- Employees: 1408 (at June 2016)
- Annual budget: A$6.9 billion (Department of Infrastructure and Transport 2013–14)
- Ministers responsible: Darren Chester, Minister for Infrastructure and Transport; Fiona Nash, Minister for Regional Development; Paul Fletcher, Minister for Territories, Local Government and Major Projects
- Department executives: Mike Mrdak, Secretary (2013–2017); Steven Kennedy, Secretary (2017)

The Department of Infrastructure and Regional Development was an Australian Government department that existed between September 2013 and December 2017. Matters dealt with by the department included: infrastructure planning and coordination; transport safety; land transport; civil aviation and airports; maritime transport including shipping; administration of Australian territories; constitutional development of the Northern Territory and the Australian Capital Territory; regional programs; regional development; local government matters; and regional policy.

The head of the department was the secretary of the Department of Infrastructure and Regional Development, who reported to the minister for Infrastructure and Transport, the minister for Regional Development and the minister for Territories, Local Government and Major Projects.

Ministers for the Department of Infrastructure and Regional Development
Start date	End date	Minister
18 September 2013	18 February 2016	Warren Truss
18 February 2016	20 December 2017	Darren Chester
18 February 2016	27 October 2017	Fiona Nash
21 September 2015	20 December 2017	Paul Fletcher
18 September 2013	21 September 2015	Jamie Briggs

The department was headquartered in the Canberra central business district at Infrastructure House and the neighbouring building to Infrastructure House.

== Operational activities ==
In an administrative arrangements order made on 18 September 2013, the functions of the department were broadly classified into the following matters:

- Infrastructure planning and co-ordination
- Transport safety, including investigations
- Land transport
- Civil aviation and airports
- Transport security
- Maritime transport including shipping
- Major projects office, including facilitation and implementation of all non-Defence development projects
- Administration of the Jervis Bay Territory, the Territory of Cocos (Keeling) Islands, the Territory of Christmas Island, the Coral Sea Islands Territory, the Territory of Ashmore and Cartier Islands, and of Commonwealth responsibilities on Norfolk Island
- Constitutional development of the Northern Territory
- Constitutional development of the Australian Capital Territory
- Delivery of regional and territory specific services and programmes
- Planning and land management in the Australian Capital Territory
- Regional development
- Matters relating to local government
- Regional policy and co-ordination

== Prominent business units ==
=== Bureau of Infrastructure, Transport and Regional Economics ===
The Bureau of Infrastructure, Transport and Regional Economics (BITRE) within the department provides economic analysis, research and statistics on infrastructure, transport and regional development issues to inform Australian Government policy development and wider community understanding. BITRE employs around 30 staff, including statisticians, economists and policy analysts. BITRE was first established in 1970 as the Bureau of Transport Economics by the Cabinet.

=== Office of Transport Security ===
The Office of Transport Security (OTS), a business division within the department, was the Australian Government's preventive security regulator for the aviation and maritime sectors, and its primary adviser on transport security. The OTS head office was in Canberra, and regional offices were situated in Brisbane, Sydney, Melbourne, Adelaide and Perth.

== Structure and staff ==
The department was administered by a senior executive, comprising a secretary and several deputy secretaries.

The secretary between 2009 and 2017 was Mike Mrdak. Steven Kennedy was appointed the department's secretary in September 2017.

The department had a staff of around 994 people (estimate for 2013–14), of which around 836 were employed in Canberra and 15 were based overseas. Staff were employed as part of the Australian Public Service under the Public Service Act 1999. The workforce of the department had a reasonably even gender distribution (54% male, 46% female), but at more senior levels this ratio decreases. Around two-thirds of the department held a bachelor's degree or higher.

The department worked closely with several Australian Government agencies within its portfolio, including:

- the Australian Transport Safety Bureau (ATSB);
- the Australian Rail Track Corporation;
- Airservices Australia;
- the Australian Maritime Safety Authority;
- the Civil Aviation Safety Authority (CASA); and
- the National Transport Commission.

== Budget and finance ==
In the department's 2013–14 budget statements, expenses were categorised as either departmental or administered expenses. Departmental expenses were those within the control of the relevant agency, whereas administered expenses were those administered on behalf of the Government. Expenses could be broken down as follows:

Program	Funding (billions)
Administered expenses through the Department of the Treasury	$4.627
Administered expenses through the Department of Infrastructure and Transport	$2.038
Departmental expenses	$0.212
Total	$6.877

=== Audit of expenditures ===
The department's financial statements were audited by the Australian National Audit Office.

== History ==
The Department of Infrastructure and Regional Development was formed by way of an Administrative Arrangements Order issued on 18 September 2013, and replaced the majority of the functions previously performed by the former Department of Infrastructure and Transport and some of the functions previously performed by the former Department of Regional Australia, Local Government, Arts and Sport; with the exception of the arts functions that were transferred to the Attorney-General's Department and the sports functions that were assumed by the Department of Health and Ageing.

The department was superseded by the Department of Infrastructure, Regional Development and Cities on 20 December 2017, which in turn was superseded by the Department of Infrastructure, Transport, Regional Development and Communications on 5 December 2019.
