= Murrays Beach =

Murrays Beach may refer to:

- Murrays Beach, Jervis Bay Territory, a white sand beach in Jervis Bay Territory, Australia
- Murrays Beach, New South Wales, a suburb of the City of Lake Macquarie, New South Wales, Australia.

== See also ==
- Murray Beach Provincial Park, a park in New Brunswick, Canada
