= Department of Infrastructure, Regional Development and Cities =

Australian government department

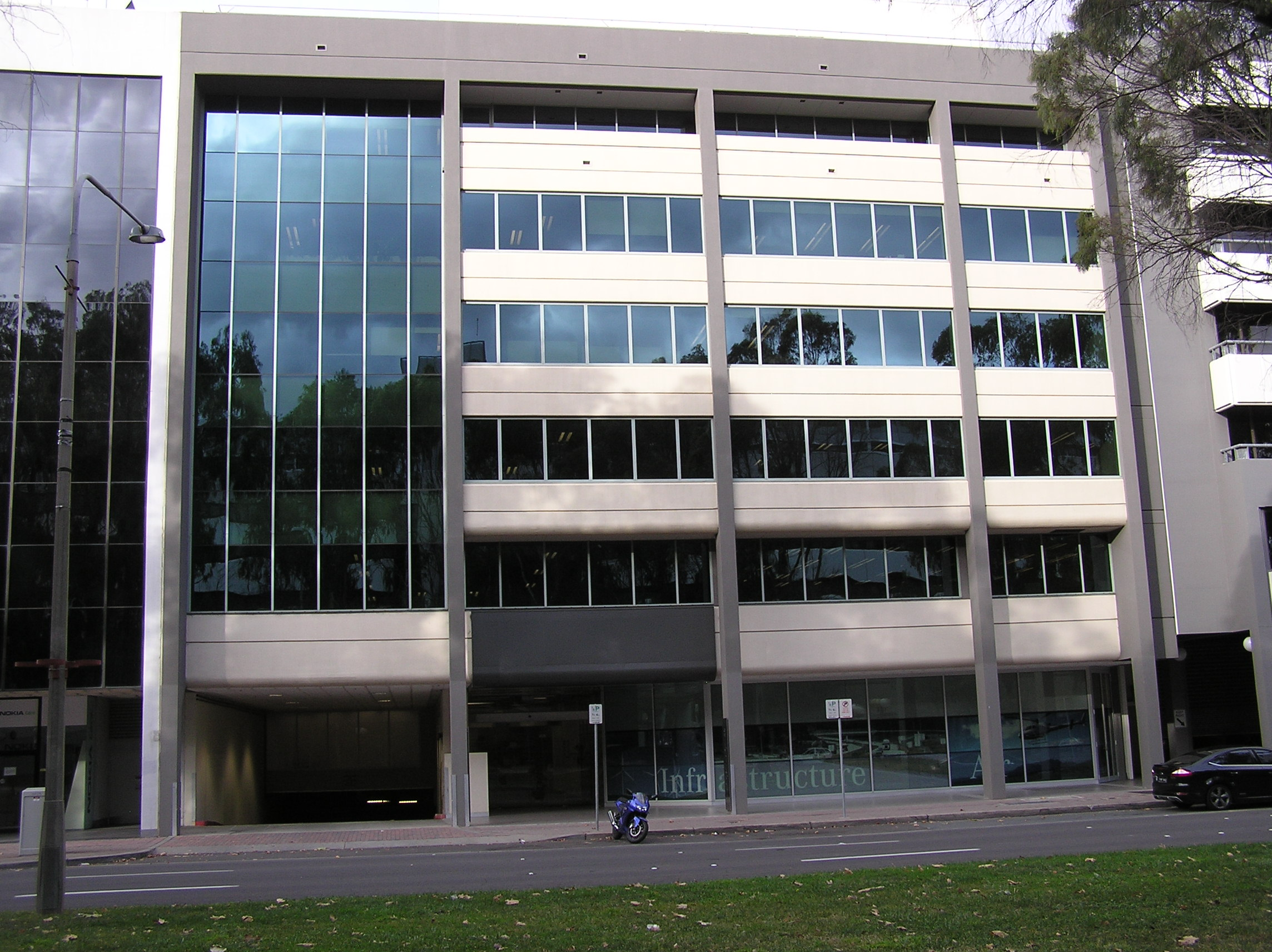
- The building at 62 Northbourne Avenue in Canberra, which housed part of the department.

Department overview
- Formed: 20 December 2017
- Preceding Department: Department of Infrastructure and Regional Development
- Dissolved: 29 May 2019
- Superseding Department: Department of Infrastructure, Transport, Cities and Regional Development
- Jurisdiction: Commonwealth Government
- Ministers responsible: Michael McCormack, Minister for Infrastructure, Transport and Regional Development; Mark Coulton, Minister for Regional Services, Decentralisation and Local Government; Alan Tudge, Minister for Cities, Urban Infrastructure and Population
- Department executive: Steven Kennedy, Secretary

The Department of Infrastructure, Transport, Regional Development and Cities was an Australian Public Service department of the Government of Australia that existed between December 2017 and May 2019, charged with the responsibility for infrastructure and major projects, transport, local government, external territories administration, rural and regional development, population policy, and cities.

When created on 20 December 2017, the department replaced the Department of Infrastructure and Regional Development. It was dissolved and remade as the Department of Infrastructure, Transport, Cities and Regional Development by Administrative Arrangements Orders made on 29 May 2019.

== Location ==
The department was headquartered in the Canberra central business district at Infrastructure House and the neighbouring building to Infrastructure House.

== Operational activities ==
In an Administrative Arrangements Order made on 20 December 2017, the functions of the department were broadly classified into the following matters:

- Infrastructure planning and co-ordination
- Transport safety, including investigations
- Land transport
- Civil aviation and airports
- Maritime transport including shipping
- Major projects office, including facilitation and implementation of all non-Defence development projects
- Administration of the Jervis Bay Territory, the Territory of Cocos (Keeling) Islands, the Territory of Christmas Island, the Coral Sea Islands Territory, the Territory of Ashmore and Cartier Islands, and of Commonwealth responsibilities on Norfolk Island
- Constitutional development of the Northern Territory
- Constitutional development of the Australian Capital Territory
- Delivery of regional and territory specific services and programmes
- Planning and land management in the Australian Capital Territory
- Regional development
- Matters relating to local government
- Regional policy and co-ordination
- National policy on cities
- Infrastructure and project financing
- Population policy

== Structure and audit of expenditure ==
The department was administered by a senior executive, comprising the Secretary, Steven Kennedy, and several Deputy Secretaries.

The department's financial statements were audited by the Australian National Audit Office.
