= ISO 3166-2:AU =

Standard Australian state codes

ISO 3166-2:AU is the entry for Australia in ISO 3166-2, part of the ISO 3166 standard published by the International Organization for Standardization (ISO), which defines codes for the names of the principal subdivisions (e.g., provinces or states) of all countries coded in ISO 3166-1.

Currently for Australia, ISO 3166-2 codes are defined for six states and two territories. Lesser territories that are under the administration of the commonwealth government, such as the Jervis Bay Territory, the Ashmore and Cartier Islands, and the Coral Sea Islands, are not listed.

Each code consists of two parts, separated by a hyphen. The first part is AU, the ISO 3166-1 alpha-2 code of Australia. The second part is two or three letters, which is the conventional abbreviation of the state or territory (defined in Australian Standard AS 4212-1994).

== Current codes ==
Subdivision names are listed as in the ISO 3166-2 standard published by the ISO 3166 Maintenance Agency (ISO 3166/MA).

Click on the button in the header to sort each column.

Code	Subdivision name (en)	Subdivision category
AU-NSW	New South Wales	state
AU-QLD	Queensland	state
AU-SA	South Australia	state
AU-TAS	Tasmania	state
AU-VIC	Victoria	state
AU-WA	Western Australia	state
AU-ACT	Australian Capital Territory	territory
AU-NT	Northern Territory	territory

The external territories of Christmas Island, the Cocos (Keeling) Islands and Norfolk Island have their own ISO 3166-1 codes and are not included in Australia's entry in ISO 3166-2. There are no ISO 3166-2 codes for:

- Ashmore and Cartier Islands
- Australian Antarctic Territory (part of Antarctica with country code AQ)
- Coral Sea Islands
- Jervis Bay Territory

== Changes ==
The following changes to the entry have been announced in newsletters by the ISO 3166/MA since the first publication of ISO 3166-2 in 1998. ISO stopped issuing newsletters in 2013.

Newsletter	Date issued	Description of change in newsletter	Code/Subdivision change
Newsletter I-6	2004-03-08	Change of subdivision code in accordance with Australian Standard AS 4212-1994	Codes: New South Wales: AU-NS → AU-NSW; Queensland: AU-QL → AU-QLD; Tasmania: AU-TS → AU-TAS; Victoria: AU-VI → AU-VIC; Australian Capital Territory: AU-CT → AU-ACT

The following changes to the entry are listed on ISO's online catalogue, the Online Browsing Platform:

Effective date of change	Short description of change (en)
2015-11-27	Update List Source
2016-11-15	Update List Source; update Code Source

== External territories ==
Four of the external territories of Australia are officially assigned their own country codes in ISO 3166-1, with the following alpha-2 codes:

- CC Cocos (Keeling) Islands
- CX Christmas Island
- HM Heard Island and McDonald Islands
- NF Norfolk Island

Under the definitions in ISO 3166-1, the Ashmore and Cartier Islands and the Coral Sea Islands are covered by Australia, and the Australian Antarctic Territory is covered by Antarctica, with alpha-2 code AQ.

== See also ==
- Subdivisions of Australia
- FIPS region codes of Australia
