= South Coast Pipe =

Place in Jervis Bay Territory, Australia

The South Coast Pipe (also known as Black Rock, Wreck Bay or Summercloud Bay) is a surf spot in the Jervis Bay Territory, Australia. It takes its name from the Banzai Pipeline in Hawaii because both breaks share many characteristics. It was originally known as just "Pipeline" or "Wreck Bay" by the few surfers who knew about it in the second half of the 1960s. The term "Black Rock" was coined by an Australia Surfing Magazine in 1970 but it remained little-known until the late 1980s.

== Location ==
The break is located in the Booderee National Park just south of Jervis Bay on the western point of Summercloud Bay. The nearest town is the Aboriginal community of Wreck Bay Village.
