= Ministry of Roads and Transport =

Ministry of Roads and Transportation may refer to:

- Ministry of Roads and Transportation (Iran)
- Ministry of Roads and Transport (Australia)

See also

- Ministry of Transport
- Ministry of Road Transport and Highways (India)
  - Minister of Road Transport and Highways
