= Murrays Beach, Jervis Bay Territory =

Beach in Jervis Bay Territory, Australia

Murrays Beach
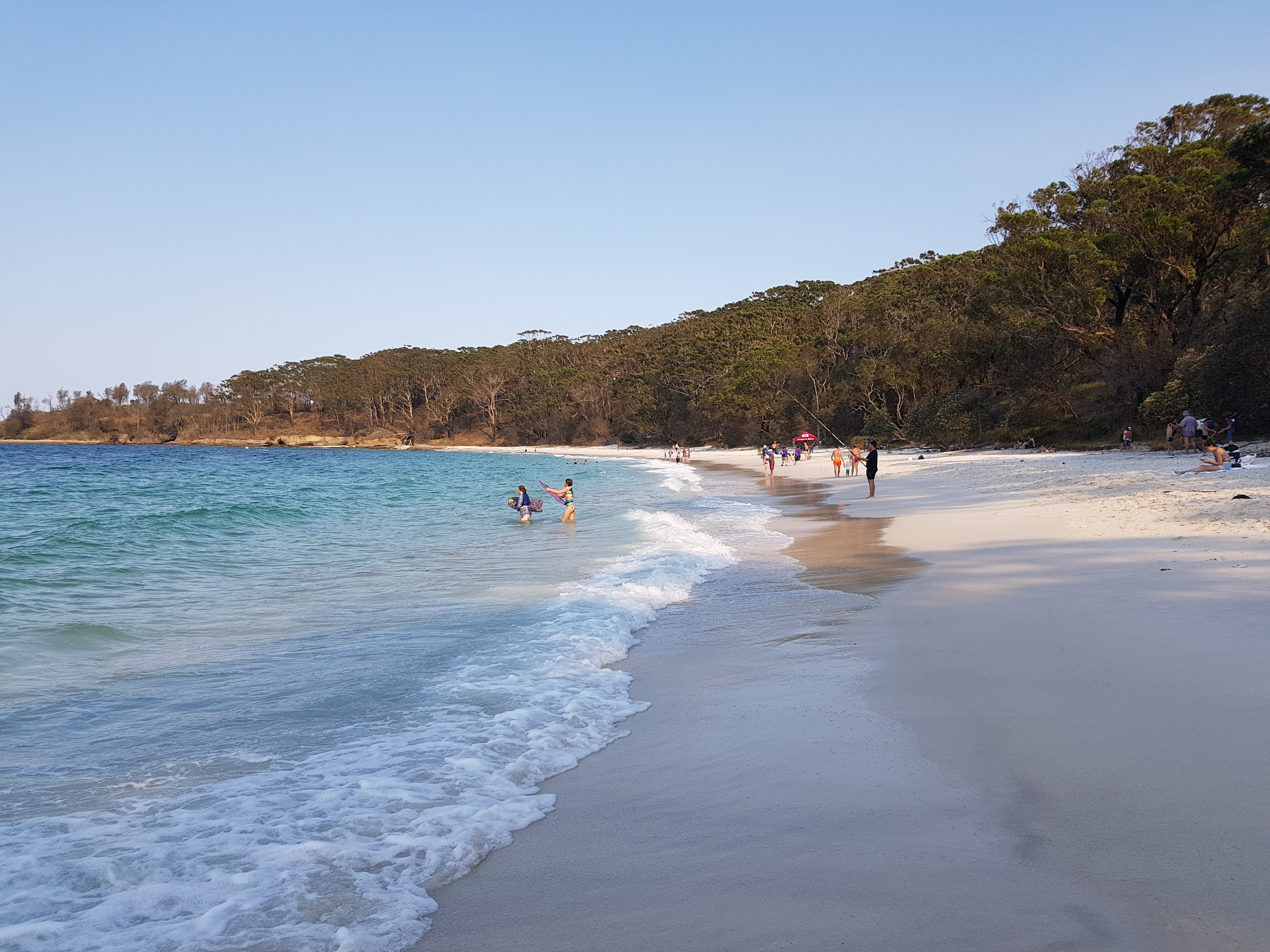
- Murrays Beach, Jervis Bay
- Interactive map of Murrays Beach
- Location: Jervis Bay Territory
- Nearest city: Nowra
- Coordinates: 35°07′30″S 150°45′29″E
- Governing body: Australian Capital Territory Government

Murrays Beach is a white-sand beach situated in Booderee National Park, part of the Jervis Bay Territory on the east coast of Australia. The beach, known for its seclusion, wildlife and bushwalking is popular for swimming and snorkelling. It is also the site of the proposed Jervis Bay Nuclear Power Plant. It was incorporated into the Booderee National Park in 1992.

== Location ==
Murrays Beach is located in a cove immediately inshore of Governor Head, at the northern tip of the Bherwerre Peninsula, itself part of Cape St. George which is the southern headland of Jervis Bay. The beach is sheltered by Bowen Island which lies just a few hundred metres offshore, across the Governor Head passage. It is approximately 5 km (3.1 mi) east of Jervis Bay Village, and 40 km (25 mi) by road from Nowra. It is the easternmost point that can be reached by public road in the Jervis Bay Territory.

The beach is 510 m (1,670 ft) long, and is backed by sand dunes that rise to 30 m (98 ft) in height, covered with dense vegetation. The waters are calm with only low swell, however the deeper water towards the channel between Bowen Island and Governor Head is prone to hazardous tidal currents.

== History ==
In October 1969, the Gorton government announced that a 500 MWe nuclear power station would be constructed at Murrays Beach. Also in 1969, Bitou bush (Osteospermum moniliferum) was introduced into the area to help stabilise sand dunes.

Work on the proposed reactor progressed with the Australian Atomic Energy Commission undertaking ecological and geological studies around the beach and in the water during 1970. Construction was completed of an all weather access road and excavation work began at the site during 1971. The project was deferred that year due to concerns around its economic viability after William McMahon became Prime Minister.

In 1975, a parliamentary standing committee recommended that the Murrays Beach nuclear reactor site be repurposed for use as a natural sciences research facility, operating under strict conditions to protect the natural environment.

A proposal in the late 1980s to relocate the Royal Australian Navy's main east coast base and ammunition depot to the southern foreshore of Jervis Bay was abandoned after facing strong community opposition, which cited the plan's impact on tourism and the natural vistas of Murrays Beach, among other locations.

Occasional reports that the government was considering the resumption of construction of the nuclear reactor persisted until the early 1990s. On 4 March 1992 Murrays Beach, along with nearby Greenpatch and Bowen Island were incorporated into a new National Park, protecting the natural environment from further development.

== Attractions ==
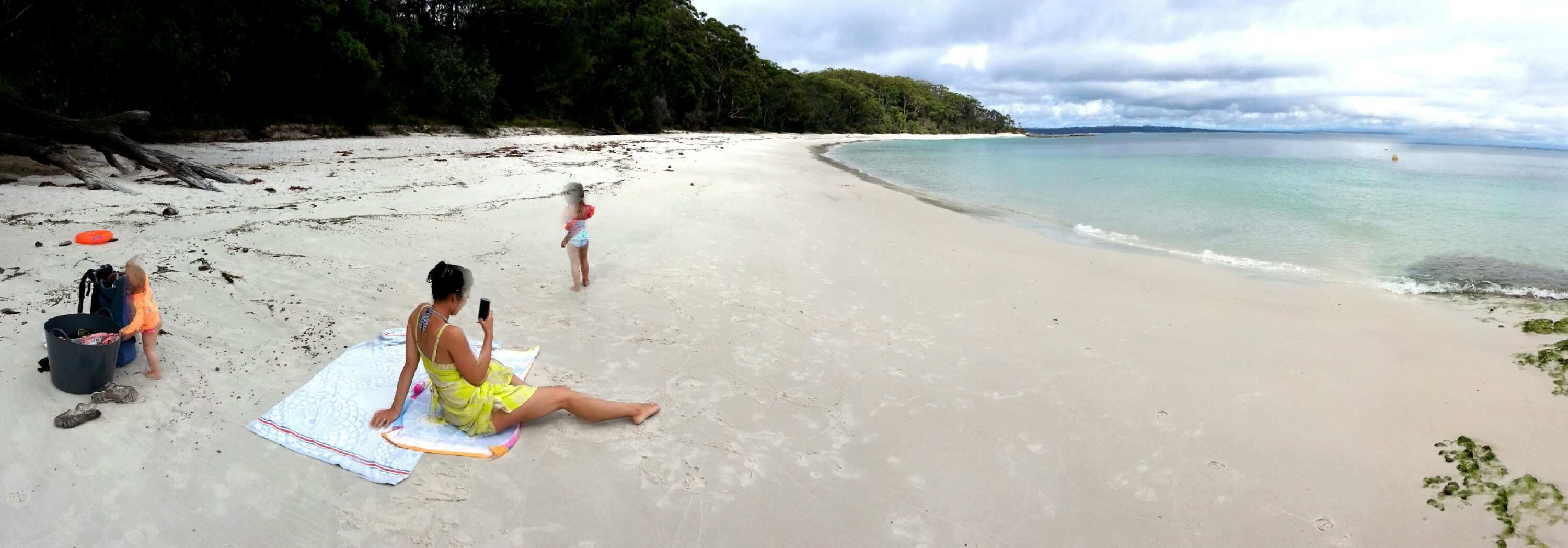
Family on Murrays Beach

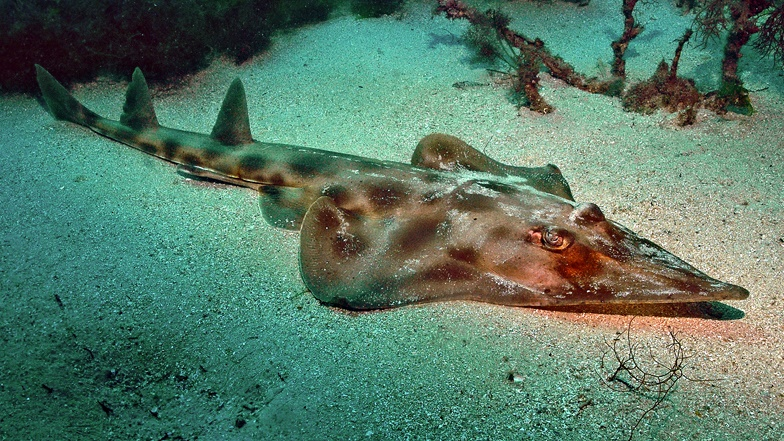
Eastern shovelnose ray (Aptychotrema rostrata) at Murrays Beach

Murrays Beach has featured in many travel magazines, as well as bushwalking and diving blogs. The beach is a frequent subject in national tourism media due to its isolation and wildlife. News Corp Australia travel reporter James Booth has likened the white sands and calm, clear waters to The Maldives.

Notable attractions include a sea cave at the eastern end of the beach. The Munyunga Waraga Dhugan is a 5.4 km (3.4 mi) loop trail that begins and ends at Murrays Beach. This track provides opportunities for whale watching, and takes in views of the beach itself, Governor Head sea cliffs, and a fairy penguin colony on Bowen Island. The Murrays Beach boat ramp is a popular spot for snorkelling and diving, providing easy access to different underwater environments including caves, reefs and seagrass meadows. Stingrays and sharks are common in the sheltered waters.

The beach is not patrolled by surf lifesavers.

== Access ==
As Murrays Beach is within the Booderee National Park, visitors must pay an entry fee. Once inside the park, access is via Jervis Bay Road. There is a large car park above the beach (this is the site excavated in 1971 for the nuclear power station.) An accessible boardwalk connects the car park and boat ramp to the beach itself.
