= Department of Infrastructure, Transport, Cities and Regional Development =

Australian government department, 2019–2020

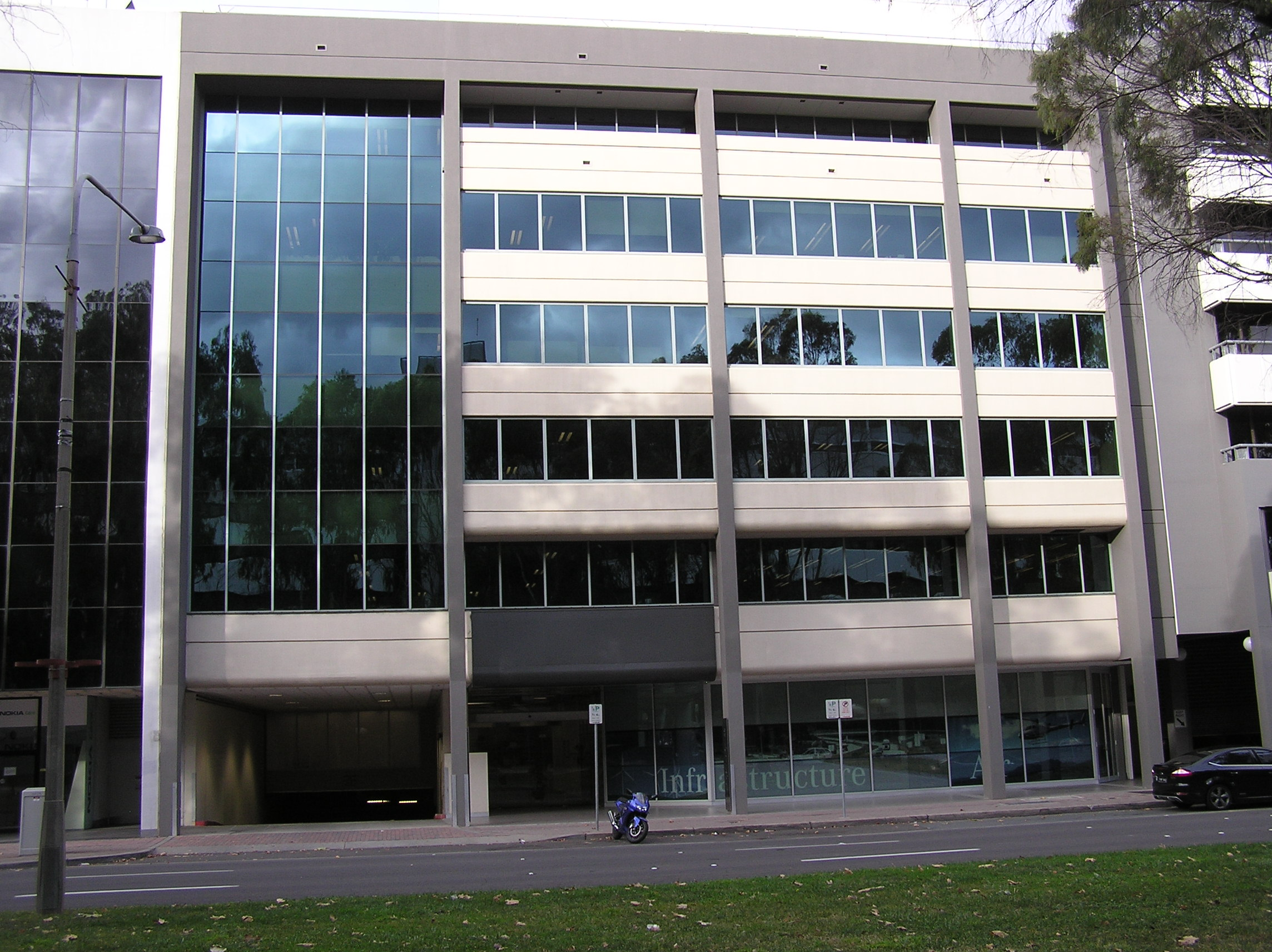
- The building at 62 Northbourne Avenue in Canberra, which housed part of the department.

Department overview
- Formed: 29 May 2019
- Preceding Department: Department of Infrastructure, Regional Development and Cities
- Dissolved: 31 January 2020
- Superseding Department: Department of Infrastructure, Transport, Regional Development and Communications
- Jurisdiction: Commonwealth Government
- Ministers responsible: Michael McCormack, Minister for Infrastructure, Transport and Regional Development; Mark Coulton, Minister for Regional Services, Decentralisation and Local Government; Alan Tudge, Minister for Cities, Urban Infrastructure and Population
- Department executives: Steven Kennedy, Secretary (2019–2020); Simon Atkinson, Secretary (2020)

The Department of Infrastructure, Transport, Cites and Regional Development was an Australian Public Service department of the Government of Australia that existed between May 2019 and January 2020, charged with the responsibility for infrastructure and major projects, transport, local government, external territories administration, rural and regional development, population policy, and cities.

When created on 29 May 2019, the department replaced the Department of Infrastructure, Regional Development and Cities. The department was merged with the Department of Communications and the Arts in January 2020 to form a "superdepartment", the Department of Infrastructure, Transport, Regional Development and Communications.

== Location ==
The department was headquartered in the Canberra central business district at Infrastructure House and the neighbouring building to Infrastructure House.

== Structure and audit of expenditure ==
The department was administered by a senior executive, comprising a Secretary and several Deputy Secretaries.

The department's financial statements were audited by the Australian National Audit Office.
