= Wreck Bay Village =

- Town
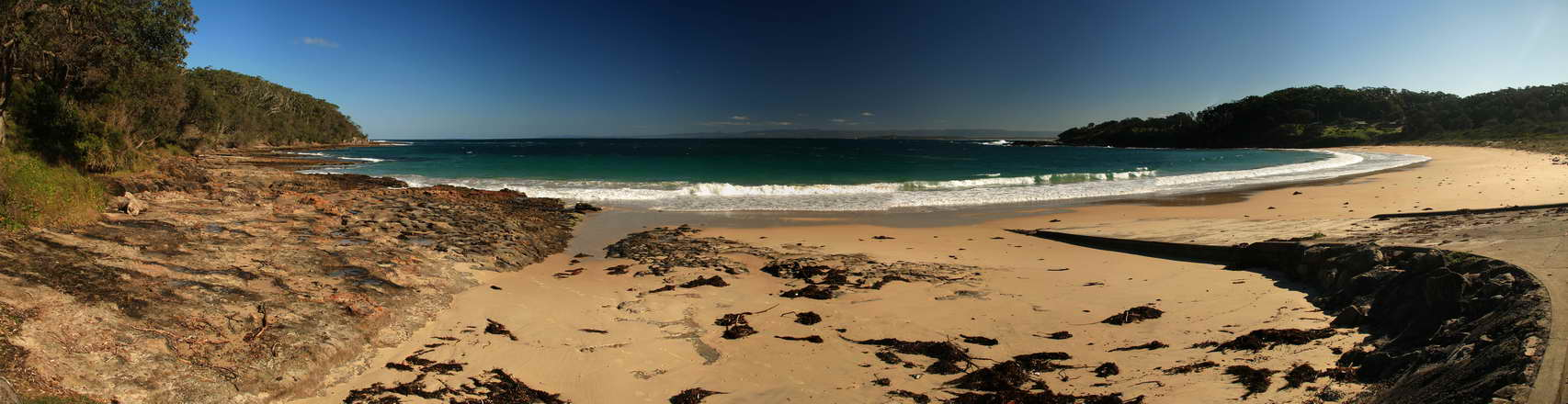
- Panorama of Wreck Bay, with the village on the far right

- Coordinates: 35°10′00″S 150°41′23″E
- Country: Australia
- State: Jervis Bay Territory
- Location: 204 km (127 mi) ENE of Canberra; 6.6 km (4.1 mi) S of Jervis Bay Village

Government
  - Federal division: Fenner
- Elevation: 30 m (98 ft)

Population
  - Total: 152 (ILOC 2021)
- Time zone: UTC+10 (AEST)
  - Summer (DST): UTC+11 (AEDT)
- Postcode: 2540
- Mean max temp: 20.6 °C (69.1 °F)
- Mean min temp: 14.2 °C (57.6 °F)
- Annual rainfall: 1,165.6 mm (45.89 in)

Wreck Bay Village or Wreck Bay Aboriginal Community Village, formerly Wreck Bay Aboriginal Reserve, is an Aboriginal village in the Jervis Bay Territory, Australia. At the 2021 census the population was 152. It is mainly an Australian Aboriginal community, run by the Wreck Bay Aboriginal Community Council.

== Geography ==
Wreck Bay Village is at the northeast corner of Wreck Bay between the small coves called Mary Bay and Summercloud Bay. It is in the south of the territory. It is about 2 km (1.2 mi) south of Jervis Bay Airfield and 6.6 km (4.1 mi) by road from Jervis Bay Village.

== History ==
The first European settlement around Jervis Bay started in the early 1880s. Wreck Bay forms part of the Jervis Bay Territory, which became Commonwealth territory in 1915 so that the national government based in Canberra could have access to the sea.

Wreck Bay is so called because the waves are generally quite high and it is easy for a ship to be destroyed.

Aboriginal people started a small settlement at Summercloud Bay around the early 1900s. They favoured the area because of strong cultural ties, its closeness to both the bush and the sea for collection of food and other sources and because of its distance from European settlements. This area later became an Aboriginal reserve known as the Wreck Bay Aboriginal Reserve that was put under control of a mission manager. The decision to create this permanent settlement has enabled cultural practices to survive.

The 402 hectares (990 acres) of land was officially handed to the Aboriginal community in 1995 by the Australian Government, including Booderee National Park and Botanic Gardens.

In 2021 Nikita Ridgeway created indigenous artwork used to decorate two fire trucks used by Wreck Bay (Australia) Rural Fire Brigade. The brigade is owned and managed by the Wreck Bay Aboriginal Community Council.

== Booderee ==
The Wreck Bay Aboriginal Community owns and co-manages (with Parks Australia), the Booderee National Park and Botanic Gardens. It includes Australia's only Aboriginal-owned and managed botanical garden.

== Current status ==
The Wreck Bay Village is now private land and no public access is available.
