= Jervis Bay Village =

- Town
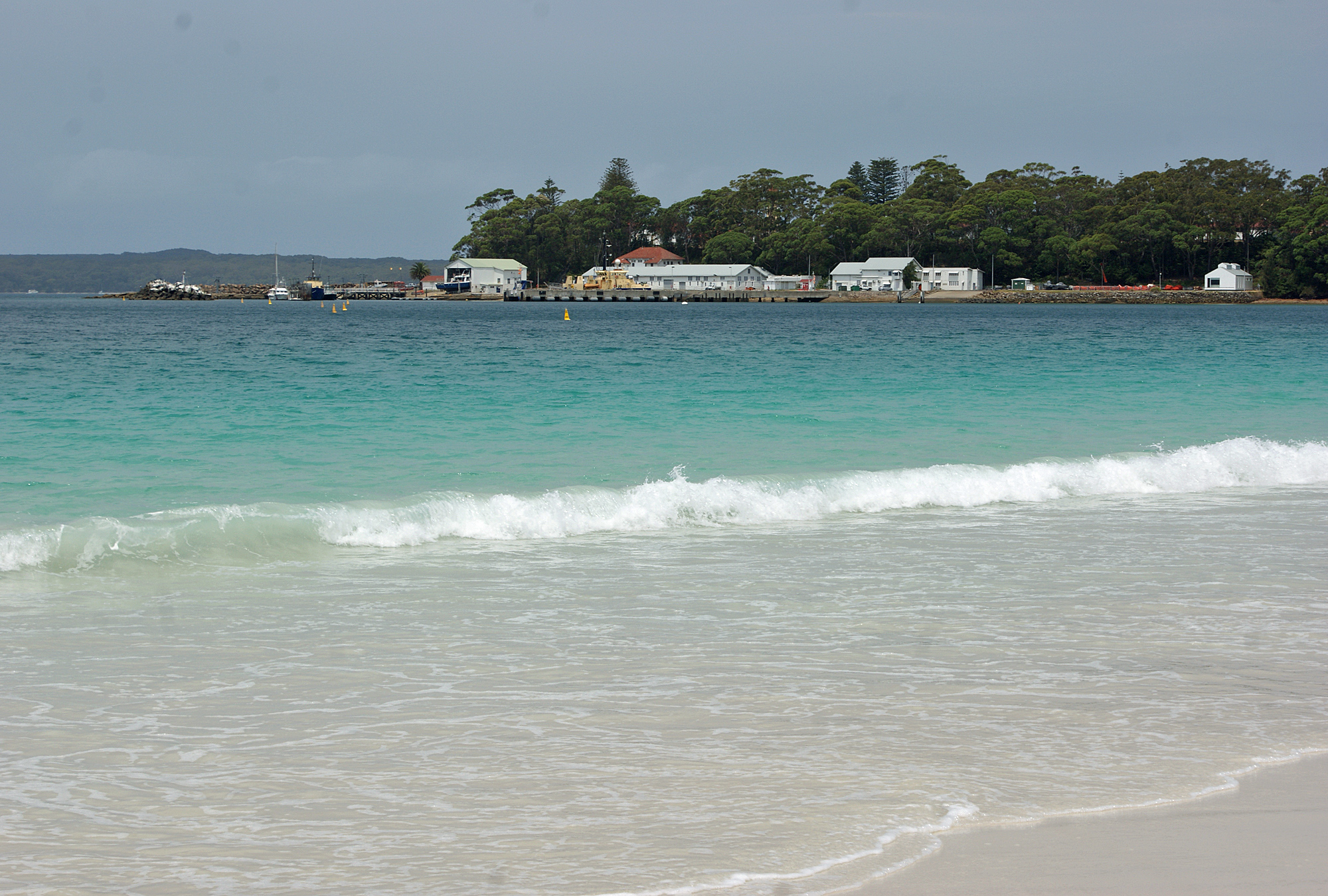

- Coordinates: 35°07′30.9″S 150°42′28.6″E
- Country: Australia
- State: Jervis Bay Territory
- Location: 204 km (127 mi) ENE of Canberra; 6.6 km (4.1 mi) N of Wreck Bay Village

Government
  - Federal division: Fenner

Population
  - Total: 128 (UCL 2021)
- Time zone: UTC+10 (AEST)
  - Summer (DST): UTC+11 (AEDT)
- Postcode: 2540
- Mean max temp: 20.2 °C (68.4 °F)
- Mean min temp: 13.8 °C (56.8 °F)
- Annual rainfall: 1,126.2 mm (44.34 in)

Jervis Bay Village is a village in the Jervis Bay Territory, Australia. HMAS Creswell Royal Australian Navy base is located in the village. Apart from the navy base, there is an Aboriginal community in the village. It is the second-largest settlement and de facto capital in the Jervis Bay Territory, with 128 inhabitants (alongside Wreck Bay Village with 152).

== History ==
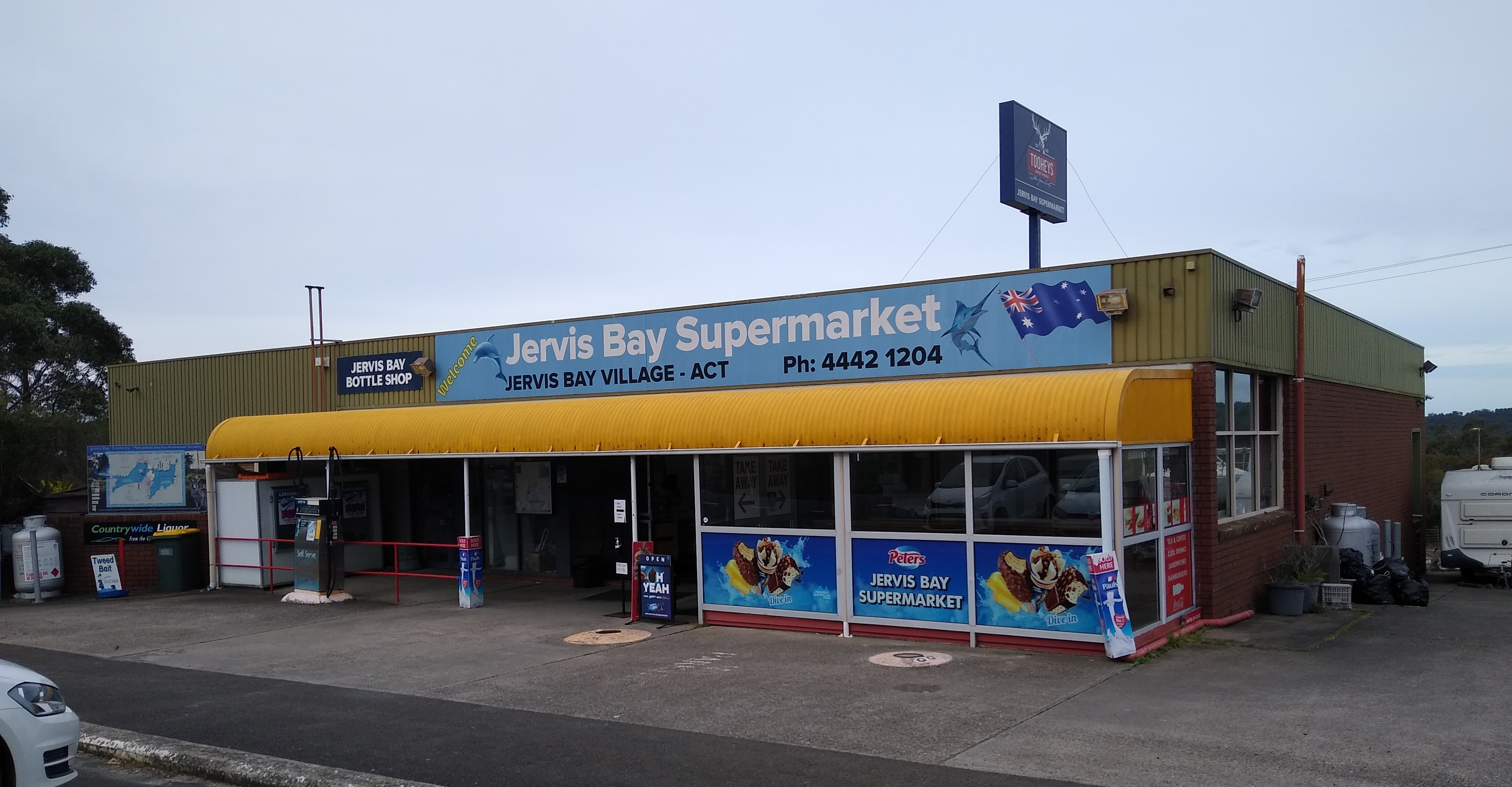
Jervis Bay Supermarket in Jervis Bay Village, 2022

The Australian Parliament selected the site of Captain's Point, Jervis Bay, for the Royal Australian Naval College on 7 November 1911. Construction of the main college buildings was completed in 1915 and the first two entries of cadet midshipmen moved from the temporary college at Geelong on 10 February 1915.

== Climate ==
The Jervis Bay experiences an oceanic climate (Köppen: Cfb) bordering on a humid subtropical climate (Köppen: Cfa) with warm and temperate conditions experienced, rarely experiencing extreme heat or frost. Due to the oceanic influence, summer seasonal lag is pronounced. For example, February is the warmest month, March is warmer than December and April is warmer than November.

Summers are usually warm and humid, with moderate precipitation primarily from cold fronts from the Tasman Sea. The position of Jervis Bay on a peninsula increases oceanic influence, limiting diurnal and annual temperature variation, while increasing relative humidity, dew point and wind speed. Occasionally, very hot conditions can be experienced, when a 39.7 °C (103.5 °F) daily high was recorded on 14 February 1991, and a 23.5 °C (74.3 °F) daily low was recorded on 9 January 2003. Relative humidity is almost always high (unless northwesterly winds from the desert lower the humidity), and the 3pm dew point temperature is 17.9 °C (64.2 °F), which will feel humid to most.

Autumns, which arrive late from the warming effects of the Tasman Sea, are comfortable and rainy. It is the rainiest season because the difference between land and sea temperature is the greatest. Due to the unpredictable nature of cold fronts, precipitation is rather variable, ranging from 4.6 mm (0.18 inches) in April 1997 to 169.9 mm (6.69 inches) on 10 April 1997. In addition, Autumn experiences the most precipitation days; on an average year, 3.4 days in Autumn record more than 25 mm (0.98 inches). Hot and cold temperatures are uncommon, but 30.0 °C (86.0 °F) occurred on 8 April 1998, and a 5.7 °C (42.3 °F) was recorded on 23 April 1999.

Winters are cool and wet, and is moderated by the sea especially compared to inland lowland areas in New South Wales, as the cities of Wagga Wagga and Albury average 7.8 °C (46.0 °F) and 8.2 °C (46.8 °F) respectively, and going below freezing occurs in most years, and morning frost is normal in both cities. The season starts wet, but foehn winds gradually reduce precipitation over the season. Cold temperatures are a rarity, but a freezing temperature of -0.4 °C (31.3 °F) was recorded on 25 August 1997. High rainfall totals in each month have been recorded, from 240.6 mm (9.47 inches) in July 2001 to 433.1 mm (17.05 inches) in August 1998.

Springs are comfortable cool and moderately dry, and the general southwesterly wind direction places Jervis Bay in a rain shadow during this season, reaching an average precipitation of just 61.5 mm (2.51 inches) in October. Despite the low precipitation, humidity is very similar to autumn. Spring, like on the New South Wales coast, is the most variable season, as temperatures of 34.9 °C (94.8 °F) and 1.7 °C (35.1 °F) were recorded on 27 November 1997 and 19 September 2002 respectively. Despite the oceanic influence, temperatures of 12.0 °C (53.6 °F) may occur even at the end of November.

Climate data for Jervis Bay Point Perpendicular Lighthouse Climate, Australia 1991-2004 normals, extremes 1946-2002
Month	Jan	Feb	Mar	Apr	May	Jun	Jul	Aug	Sep	Oct	Nov	Dec	Year
Record high °C (°F)	34.0 (93.2)	39.7 (103.5)	34.3 (93.7)	30.0 (86.0)	27.0 (80.6)	22.9 (73.2)	21.9 (71.4)	27.9 (82.2)	28.7 (83.7)	32.2 (90.0)	34.9 (94.8)	36.0 (96.8)	39.7 (103.5)
Mean daily maximum °C (°F)	24.2 (75.6)	24.4 (75.9)	23.0 (73.4)	21.1 (70.0)	18.6 (65.5)	16.6 (61.9)	15.6 (60.1)	16.8 (62.2)	18.5 (65.3)	20.1 (68.2)	21.0 (69.8)	23.1 (73.6)	20.2 (68.4)
Daily mean °C (°F)	21.1 (70.0)	21.4 (70.5)	20.1 (68.2)	18.0 (64.4)	15.7 (60.3)	13.6 (56.5)	12.6 (54.7)	13.2 (55.8)	15.0 (59.0)	16.6 (61.9)	17.7 (63.9)	19.9 (67.8)	17.0 (62.6)
Mean daily minimum °C (°F)	17.9 (64.2)	18.4 (65.1)	17.1 (62.8)	14.9 (58.8)	12.8 (55.0)	10.6 (51.1)	9.5 (49.1)	9.5 (49.1)	11.4 (52.5)	13.0 (55.4)	14.3 (57.7)	16.6 (61.9)	13.8 (56.8)
Record low °C (°F)	11.8 (53.2)	10.0 (50.0)	10.0 (50.0)	6.0 (42.8)	5.7 (42.3)	2.5 (36.5)	1.7 (35.1)	−0.4 (31.3)	1.7 (35.1)	5.7 (42.3)	2.7 (36.9)	9.0 (48.2)	−0.4 (31.3)
Average precipitation mm (inches)	88.2 (3.47)	91.0 (3.58)	89.5 (3.52)	103.2 (4.06)	151.3 (5.96)	110.3 (4.34)	106.5 (4.19)	83.5 (3.29)	83.2 (3.28)	61.5 (2.42)	93.8 (3.69)	62.0 (2.44)	1,126.2 (44.34)
Average precipitation days (≥ 1 mm)	9.4	9.0	9.0	8.4	11.5	8.6	9.2	6.0	8.5	8.3	10.2	8.8	106.9
Average afternoon relative humidity (%)	71	72	71	68	67	65	63	61	64	66	69	70	67
Average dew point °C (°F)	16.8 (62.2)	17.3 (63.1)	16.0 (60.8)	13.3 (55.9)	10.7 (51.3)	8.4 (47.1)	6.9 (44.4)	7.3 (45.1)	9.1 (48.4)	11.3 (52.3)	13.4 (56.1)	15.3 (59.5)	12.2 (53.9)
Source: Australian Bureau of Meteorology
