= Steven Kennedy =

Australian public servant

Dr Steven Kennedy PSM

Secretary of the Department of the Prime Minister and Cabinet
- Incumbent
- Assumed office 16 June 2025
- Preceded by: Glyn Davis

Secretary of the Department of the Treasury
- In office 2 September 2019 – 16 June 2025
- Preceded by: Phil Gaetjens
- Succeeded by: Jenny Wilkinson

Secretary of the Department of Infrastructure, Transport, Cities and Regional Development
- In office 7 September 2017 – 2 September 2019
- Preceded by: Mike Mrdak

Personal details
- Born: Steven Kennedy
- Education: The Australian National University (PhD, MEc); University of Sydney (BEc)

Steven Kennedy PSM is an Australian public servant. He is the secretary of the Department of Prime Minister and Cabinet. He previously served as secretary of the Department of the Treasury from September 2019 to June 2025 and secretary of the Department of Infrastructure, Transport, Cities and Regional Development from September 2017 to August 2019. Kennedy helped convince the Morrison government to implement JobKeeper during the COVID-19 pandemic.

In 2024, it was reported that Kennedy is the seventh most highly paid Australian public servant (when executives working at government business enterprises are excluded). Earning $959,257, Kennedy is behind Glyn Davis (Prime Minister and Cabinet), Jan Adams (Foreign Affairs and Trade), Greg Moriarty (Defence), Natalie James (Employment and Workplace Relations), Tony Cook (Education), and Jim Betts (Infrastructure).

== Early years ==
Kennedy grew up in the town of Murwillumbah, on the NSW north coast. At age 19, Kennedy's first full time job was as a nurse. He later commented that this was an eye- opening experience for him.

He listens to alternative music from the 1980s like Hoodoo Gurus and Sunnyboys, and his favourite film is Interstellar.

== Other issues ==
In early 2025, the opposition Coalition proposed a policy to enable some businesses to deduct business-related meal and entertainment expenses without incurring fringe benefits tax.

The independent Parliamentary Budget Office (PBO) costed this proposal at less than $250 million in total, but Kennedy instructed the Treasury Department to expend tax-payer resources to cost this policy as well. Treasury ultimately costed the policy at between $1.6 billion and $10 billion per year.

Some argued that using the Treasury and public service in this way was at odds with convention since the establishment of the independent PBO and veteran budget economist, Chris Richardson, argued that this amounted to using the public service in a politicised way.

== Honours and recognition ==
Kennedy was awarded the Public Service Medal in the 2016 Queen's Birthday Honours for "outstanding public service in the area of climate change policy". He was elected a Fellow of the Academy of the Social Sciences in Australia in 2025.
