= Department of Infrastructure, Transport, Regional Development and Communications =

Former Australian Government Department February 2020 and June 2022

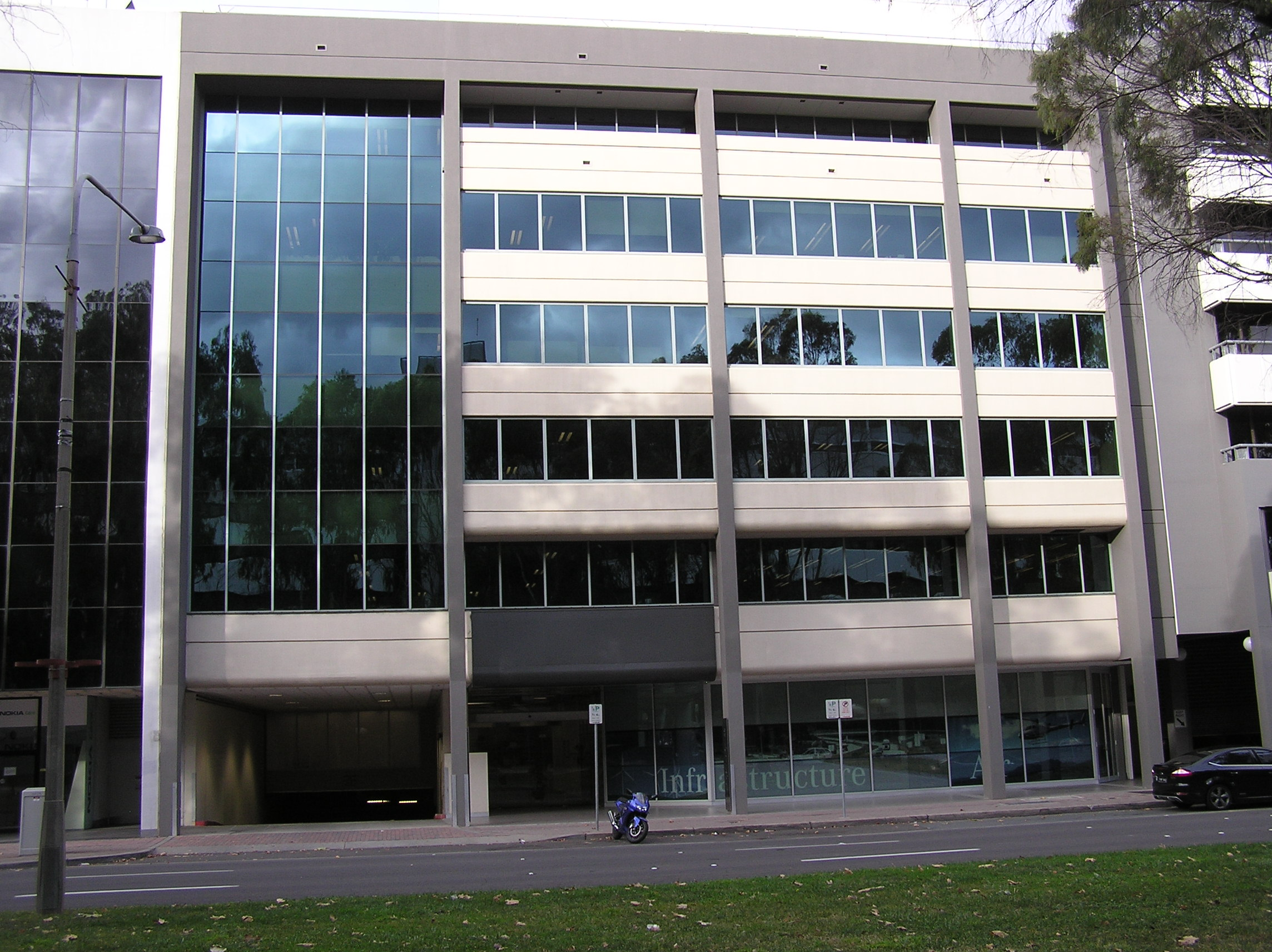
- The building at 62 Northbourne Avenue in Canberra, which housed part of the department.

Department overview
- Formed: 1 February 2020
- Preceding agencies: Department of Infrastructure, Transport, Cities and Regional Development; Department of Communications and the Arts
- Dissolved: 30 June 2022
- Superseding Department: Department of Infrastructure, Transport, Regional Development, Communications and the Arts
- Jurisdiction: Commonwealth Government
- Minister responsible: Catherine King, Infrastructure, Transport, Regional Development and Local Government
- Department executive: Simon Atkinson, Secretary

The Department of Infrastructure, Transport, Regional Development and Communications was an Australian Public Service department of the Australian Government that existed between February 2020 and June 2022, responsible for transport infrastructure, transport policy, local government, external territories administration, rural and regional development, communications and the arts.

== Formation and succession ==
The department was formed on 1 February 2020 from the Department of Infrastructure, Transport, Cities and Regional Development and the Department of Communications and the Arts. The announcement of the merger of the two departments, and specifically not including the word 'Arts' in the new department's title, was criticised by some in the arts industry, being seen as an attack on the arts. The department retained portfolio responsibilities to arts.

After the 2022 election, the newly elected Albanese government decided to replace the department with the Department of Infrastructure, Transport, Regional Development, Communications and the Arts.

== Location ==
The department was headquartered in the Canberra central business district at Infrastructure House and the neighbouring building to Infrastructure House.

== Structure and audit of expenditure ==
The department was administered by a senior executive, comprising a Secretary (Simon Atkinson) and several Deputy Secretaries, and was accountable to several ministers, including Catherine King. The department was accountable to several ministers.

The department's financial statements were audited by the Australian National Audit Office.
