= States and territories of Australia =

National subdivisions and second level of government of Australia.

- Map depicting Mainland Australia's states and its territories labelled in lime and dark green
- Location: Australia
- Number: 16 (6 states, 3 internal territories, and 7 external territories)
- Populations: Least populous state: Tasmania 580,691; Most populous state: New South Wales 8,670,105; Least populous inhabited territories: Jervis Bay Territory 305; Cocos (Keeling) Islands 593; Uninhabited territories: Ashmore and Cartier Islands 0; Heard Island and McDonald Islands 0; Most populous territory: Australian Capital Territory 489,668
- Areas: Smallest state: Tasmania 68,401 km^{2} (26,410 sq mi); Largest state: Western Australia 2,527,013 km^{2} (975,685 sq mi); Smallest territory: Cocos (Keeling) Islands 14 km^{2} (5.4 sq mi); Largest territory: Australian Antarctic Territory (Note: The Australian Antarctic Territory covers nearly 5.9 million square kilometres, about 42% of Antarctica, but this claim is only recognised by France, New Zealand, Norway, and the United Kingdom. Antarctic territorial claims are generally unrecognised by the international community.) 5,896,500 km^{2} (2,276,700 sq mi); Largest inhabited territory: Northern Territory 1,347,791 km^{2} (520,385 sq mi)
- Subdivisions: Local government areas and unincorporated areas

The states and territories are the sub-national constituent entities and the second level of government of Australia. The states are partially-sovereign administrative divisions that function as self-governing polities, having ceded some sovereign rights to the federal government. They have their own constitutions, legislatures, executive governments, judiciaries, law enforcement agencies and emergency services that administer and deliver public policies and programs. Territories can be autonomous and administer policies and programs much like the states in practice, but are still legally subordinate to the federal government.

Australia has six federated states: New South Wales, Queensland, South Australia, Tasmania, Victoria, and Western Australia; and ten federal territories, comprising three internal territories on the mainland and seven offshore external territories. The Australian Capital Territory (ACT) and Northern Territory are self-governing and are for the most part treated as states, with elected legislative assemblies and chief ministers (the equivalent of state premiers) and representation in both chambers of the federal parliament. The remaining territories have local governments, application of state laws in certain circumstances, and are overseen by federal departments.

State and territory parliaments may pass legislation subject to the limits of the federal constitution (notably Section 51 and Section 109). Each state and internal territory (except the Jervis Bay Territory) has its own legislature; the Federal Parliament can override territorial legislation, but this is extremely rare. The High Court of Australia acts as a final court of appeal on all matters, and has the authority to override any state judiciary.

== History ==
Territorial evolution of Australia

=== Colonial origins ===
The states originated as separate British colonies prior to Federation in 1901. The Colony of New South Wales was founded in 1788 and originally comprised much of the Australian mainland, as well as Lord Howe Island, New Zealand, Norfolk Island, and Van Diemen's Land, in addition to the area currently referred to as the state of New South Wales. During the 19th century, large areas were successively separated to form the Colony of Tasmania (initially established as a separate colony named Van Diemen's Land in 1825), the Colony of Western Australia (initially established as the smaller Swan River Colony in 1829), the Province of South Australia (1836), the Colony of New Zealand (1840), the Victoria Colony (1851) and the Colony of Queensland (1859). Upon federation, the six colonies of New South Wales, Victoria, Queensland, South Australia, Western Australia, and Tasmania became the founding states of the new Commonwealth of Australia.

=== Federation ===
At Federation in 1901, what is now the Northern Territory was within South Australia, what are now the Australian Capital Territory and Jervis Bay Territory were within New South Wales, and the Coral Sea Islands were part of Queensland. The Ashmore and Cartier Islands were accepted by Australia in 1934 and were administered as part of the Northern Territory. The two self-governing territory governments (the Australian Capital Territory [ACT] and the Northern Territory [NT]) were created by legislation of the Federal Parliament: the NT in 1978 and the ACT in 1989.

=== Territorial evolution ===
- 1788 – British Empire establishes the Colony of New South Wales across central and eastern mainland Australia, the island of Tasmania, both islands of New Zealand and Norfolk Island.
- 1803 – The Coral Sea Islands are claimed by New South Wales.
- 1825 – The island of Tasmania becomes the independent colony of Van Diemen's Land. New South Wales extends its borders further west in mainland Australia.
- 1829 – The British Empire establishes the Swan River Colony in western mainland Australia.
- 1832 – Swan River Colony is renamed the "colony of Western Australia".
- 1836 – The Colony of South Australia is established.
- 1841 – The islands of New Zealand become the independent colony of New Zealand. Much of eastern Antarctica is annexed by Britain as Victoria Land.
- 1844 – New South Wales transfers Norfolk Island to Van Diemen's Land.
- 1846 – Northern central and eastern Australia briefly become the British colony of North Australia, then are returned to New South Wales.
  Map of Australia, 1851
- 1851 – Southeastern mainland Australia becomes the independent colony of Victoria.
- 1856 – Van Diemen's Land is renamed the colony of Tasmania. Norfolk Island becomes a separate settlement of Norfolk Island, administered by the same governor as New South Wales.
- 1857 – Much of southern central mainland Australia becomes the independent colony of South Australia. The Cocos (Keeling) Islands are annexed by Britain.
- 1859 – Northeastern mainland Australia and Coral Sea Islands become the independent colony of Queensland.
- 1860 – A pocket of New South Wales territory remaining in southern central mainland Australia is transferred to South Australia.
- 1862 – Some of New South Wales' northern central mainland Australian territory is transferred to Queensland.
- 1863 – New South Wales' remaining northern central mainland Australian territory is transferred to South Australia.
- 1878 – Britain annexes Ashmore Island.
- 1884 – Britain annexes British New Guinea.
- 1886 – The Cocos (Keeling) Islands are to be administered by the same governor as the Straits Settlements.
- 1888 – Christmas Island is annexed by Britain and incorporated into the Straits Settlements.
- 1897 – Norfolk Island is officially reintegrated into New South Wales.
- 1901 – New South Wales, Queensland, Tasmania, Western Australia, Victoria and South Australia federate into the Commonwealth of Australia. Queensland transfers the Coral Sea Islands to the federal government, creating a federal external territory.
- 1902 – Britain transfers British New Guinea to Australia, forming Territory of Papua as an external territory.
- 1903 – The Cocos (Keeling) Islands are incorporated into the Straits Settlements.
- 1909 – Britain annexes Cartier Island.
- 1910 – Britain claims Heard Island and the McDonald Islands.
- 1911 – The state of South Australia transfers control of northern central mainland Australia to the federal government, creating the Northern Territory. A small pocket of New South Wales around the city of Canberra is transferred to the federal government (who are seated within it), creating the Federal Capital Territory.
- 1913 – New South Wales transfers Norfolk Island to the federal government, making it a federal external territory.
- 1915 – A small pocket of New South Wales around Jervis Bay is transferred to the federal government and incorporated into the Federal Capital Territory.
- 1920 – Following the defeat of the German Empire in World War I, the League of Nations establishes an Australian mandate in northeastern New Guinea, it becomes the external Territory of New Guinea. The mandate for Nauru is conferred on 17 December 1920.
- 1923 – Nauru is established as an Australian mandate and external territory by the League of Nations, as a co-mandate with Britain and New Zealand.
- 1927 – The Northern Territory is split into two territories: North Australia and Central Australia.
- 1930 – The remaining territory in eastern Antarctica is annexed by Britain as Enderby Land.
- 1931 – North Australia and Central Australia are reincorporated as the Northern Territory. Britain recognises Australia as possessors of the uninhabited Ashmore and Cartier Islands, making them an external federal territory.
- 1933 – Britain transfers Victoria Land and Enderby Land to Australia, creating the Australian Antarctic Territory, with ongoing limited international recognition.
- 1938 – The Federal Capital Territory is renamed the "Australian Capital Territory".
- 1942 – The Empire of Japan conquers Nauru from Australia, Britain and New Zealand as part of World War II. Japan also conquers much of the Straits Settlements, including Christmas Island. The Cocos (Keeling) Islands are not conquered and are transferred to the Colony of Ceylon.
- 1946 – The United Nations, the successor to the League of Nations, renews its mandate of New Guinea to Australia. Christmas Island is placed under the jurisdiction of the Colony of Singapore.
- 1947 – Following the defeat of Japan in World War II, the United Nations returns Nauru to Australia, Britain and New Zealand as a joint mandate. The Cocos (Keeling) Islands are transferred to Singapore.
- 1949 – Papua and New Guinea are incorporated into the singular Territory of Papua and New Guinea. Britain transfers Heard Island and the McDonald Islands to Australia, creating a federal external territory.
- 1955 – Britain transfers the Cocos (Keeling) Islands to Australia, they become an external territory.
- 1958 – Britain transfers Christmas Island to Australia, it becomes an external territory.
- 1966 – Nauru gains a Legislative Council with an elected majority.
- 1968 – Nauru becomes independent on 31 January 1968.
- 1971 – Papua and New Guinea is renamed Papua New Guinea.
- 1972 – Papua New Guinea receives self government.
- 1975 – Papua New Guinea becomes the Independent State of Papua New Guinea, ending British-Australian control.
- 1978 – Northern Territory gains self-government with certain Commonwealth control.
- 1979 – Norfolk Island gains self-government with certain Commonwealth control.
- 1989 – The Australian Capital Territory gains self-government with certain Commonwealth control. Jervis Bay becomes independent of the ACT, becoming the Jervis Bay Territory.
- 2015 – Norfolk Island loses self-government with full Commonwealth control.

== States ==
Each of the six states has its own capital city, which is also its largest population centre. The table below summarises each state's estimated resident population, land area, population density, representation in the House of Representatives, and incumbent premier.

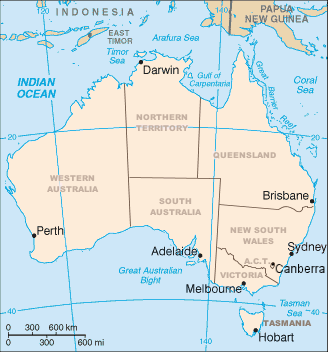
A clickable map of Australia's states, mainland territories and their capitals

States of Australia (Note: Unless provided, references and details on data provided in the table can be found within the individual state and territory articles.)
| Flag | State | ISO | Capital | Population (Mar 2026) | Area (km^{2}) | Population density (/km^{2}) | No. members in House of Reps. | Premier (Party) |
|---|---|---|---|---|---|---|---|---|
| | New South Wales | AU-NSW | Sydney | 8,670,105 | 801,150 | 10.82 | 46 | Chris Minns (Labor) |
| | Victoria | AU-VIC | Melbourne | 7,154,221 | 227,444 | 31.46 | 38 | Ben Carroll (Labor) |
| | Queensland | AU-QLD | Brisbane | 5,739,461 | 1,729,742 | 3.32 | 30 | David Crisafulli (Liberal National) |
| | Western Australia | AU-WA | Perth (Note: Perth was defined as the capital by statute in 2016: City of Perth Act 2016 (WA) in AustLII.) | 3,096,222 | 2,527,013 | 1.23 | 16 | Roger Cook (Labor) |
| | South Australia | AU-SA | Adelaide | 1,916,836 | 984,321 | 1.95 | 10 | Peter Malinauskas (Labor) |
| | Tasmania | AU-TAS | Hobart | 580,691 | 68,401 | 8.49 | 5 | Jeremy Rockliff (Liberal) |

== Territories ==
Australia has ten federal territories: three internal territories on the mainland and seven offshore external territories. The Australian Capital Territory and the Northern Territory are self-governing, with elected legislative assemblies and chief ministers, and are represented in both chambers of the federal Parliament. The remaining territories have local government status overseen by federal departments.

=== Internal territories ===
Australia has three internal territories on the mainland. Two are self-governing; the third is administered directly by the Commonwealth. The table below lists each territory's population, area, representation in the House of Representatives, and chief minister.

Internal territories of Australia (Note: Unless provided, references and details on data provided in the table can be found within the individual state and territory articles.)
| Flag | Territory | ISO | Capital (or largest settlement) | Population | Area (km^{2}) | Population density (/km^{2}) | No. members in House of Reps. | Chief Minister (Party) |
|---|---|---|---|---|---|---|---|---|
| | Australian Capital Territory | AU-ACT | Canberra | 489,668 (Mar 2026) | 2,358 | 207.7 | 3 | Andrew Barr (Labor) |
| | Northern Territory | AU-NT | Darwin | 268,899 (Mar 2026) | 1,347,791 | 0.20 | 2 | Lia Finocchiaro (Country Liberal) |
| | Jervis Bay Territory | —N/a | Jervis Bay Village (Note: Jervis Bay Village is the largest settlement; the territory has no official capital.) | 305 (2025 est.) | 67 | 4.6 | Part of ACT's Division of Fenner | Administered by the DITRDCSA. (Note: The Department of Infrastructure acts as the de facto state and local government for the Jervis Bay Territory. It has overall responsibility for providing local and state government-type services, either directly or through service delivery agreements with ACT and NSW government agencies, Shoalhaven City Council, and private contractors. These services include vehicle registration, driver licensing, domestic animal control, electricity connection, and management of Commonwealth-owned housing.) Local governance is provided by the Wreck Bay Aboriginal Community Council. (Note: The Wreck Bay Aboriginal Community Council was established under the Aboriginal Land Grant (Jervis Bay Territory) Act 1986. It is the sole owner and manager of Aboriginal land in the territory and exercises by-law-making power over 403 hectares in and around Wreck Bay Village. Shoalhaven City Council provides specific services under contract, including waste collection and library services.) |

=== External territories ===
Australia's external territories are dispersed across the Indian, Pacific, and Southern Oceans. Only three territories have permanent populations: Norfolk Island, Christmas Island, and the Cocos (Keeling) Islands. The remainder are uninhabited or host only seasonal research or meteorological staff. The table below lists each territory's capital or main settlement, languages, population, area, administering body, and local government.

External territories of Australia (Note: Unless provided, references and details on data provided in the table can be found within the individual state and territory articles.)
| Flag | Territory | ISO | Capital | Official language(s) | Population (Note: Population figures for external territories are drawn from various sources (2021 Census, 2025 estimates, seasonal staff counts) and may not be directly comparable.) | Area (km^{2}) | Population density (/km^{2}) | Administering body | Local government |
|---|---|---|---|---|---|---|---|---|---|
| | Norfolk Island | NF | Kingston | Norfuk, English | 2,193 (2025) | 35 | 63 | DITRDCSA (Note: Responsible Minister: Minister for Regional Development, Local Government and Territories, serving as Minister for Territories.) | Norfolk Island Regional Council (Note: The Norfolk Island Regional Council is under administration. Scott Mason (Lead Administrator) and Gary Mottau (Financial Administrator) were appointed from 6 December 2024, with their appointments extended until 31 December 2026.) |
| | Christmas Island | CX | Flying Fish Cove | de jure: None de facto: English, Mandarin, Malay | 1,692 (2021) | 135 | 13 | DITRDCSA | Shire of Christmas Island (Note: The flag of Christmas Island is widely used in the territory, but has not been proclaimed as a flag of Australia under the Flags Act 1953.) |
| | Cocos (Keeling) Islands | CC | West Island | de jure: None de facto: Cocos Malay, English | 593 (2021) | 14 | 42 | DITRDCSA | Shire of Cocos (Keeling) Islands (Note: The flag of the Cocos (Keeling) Islands is widely used in the territory, but has not been proclaimed as a flag of Australia under the Flags Act 1953.) |
| | Australian Antarctic Territory | AQ (Note: Under the definitions in ISO 3166-1, the AAT is covered by the Antarctican ISO 3166-1 alpha-2 code "AQ".) | None | English | 80–200 (seasonal) (Note: No permanent population. Research staff numbers fluctuate seasonally, with approximately 80 in winter and up to 200 in summer.) | 5,896,500 | 0.000029 | Australian Antarctic Division (Note: A division of the Department of Climate Change, Energy, the Environment and Water. Responsible Minister: Minister for the Environment and Water.) | None |
| | Heard Island and McDonald Islands | HM | None | None | 0 | 372 | 0 | Australian Antarctic Division | None |
| | Coral Sea Islands | —N/a | None | None | 3–4 (Note: No permanent population; Willis Island is staffed by 3–4 meteorological personnel on a rotating basis.) | 780,000 (Note: Most of which is ocean.) | 0.0000038 | DITRDCSA (Note: Responsible Minister: Minister for Regional Development, Local Government and Territories, serving as Minister for Territories.) | None |
| | Ashmore and Cartier Islands | —N/a | None | None | 0 | 199 | 0 | DITRDCSA | None |

== Former territories ==
Over its history, Australia has administered a number of territories that no longer exist as separate entities. Some, such as Papua New Guinea and Nauru, became independent countries, while others, such as North Australia and Central Australia, were reincorporated into existing territories.

=== Former internal territories ===
Two internal territories were established under section 122 of the Constitution of Australia by the Northern Australia Act 1926, which took effect on 1 February 1927 and divided the Northern Territory along the 20th parallel south into North Australia and Central Australia. The division was part of a scheme intended to improve governance of the vast Territory and to facilitate its eventual development toward statehood. Each territory was administered by a Government Resident. These administrators were located in Darwin and Alice Springs respectively, and were assisted by a partly elected Advisory Council. The scheme was abandoned on 12 June 1931, when the Northern Australia Act was repealed and the two territories were reincorporated into a single Northern Territory. Both had used the Australian flag during their existence, as neither possessed a distinctive flag of its own.

Former internal territories of Australia
| Current flag | Flag during administration | Former territory | Government resident | Notes |
|---|---|---|---|---|
| | | North Australia | Darwin | Northern portion of the Northern Territory, divided at the 20th parallel south. |
| | | Central Australia | Alice Springs | Southern portion of the Northern Territory, divided at the 20th parallel south. |

=== Former external territories ===
Several external territories were administered by Australia before achieving independence or being transferred to another arrangement. Two of these, the Territory of New Guinea and Nauru, were formerly part of German New Guinea, which was partitioned between Australia and other powers after World War I. The Territory of New Guinea was subsequently combined with the Territory of Papua and became part of present-day Papua New Guinea, while Nauru became an independent country.

The Territory of Papua had a distinctive constitutional history. In 1883, amid concerns about German colonial expansion, Sir Thomas McIlwraith, the Premier of Queensland, attempted to annex eastern New Guinea in the name of The Crown. The attempt was condemned by the Imperial Government and did not proceed, but it led to the establishment of a British protectorate over southeastern New Guinea in 1884. In 1888 the territory became a Crown Colony, with an Imperial Administrator appointed from London. Under the Letters Patent of 8 June 1888, the Administrator was subject to the control of the Governor of Queensland, who was to consult his ministers but was not bound by their advice; the Governor exercised this authority as persona designata, in his personal capacity as an individual designated by the Crown, rather than as a representative of the Queensland government. This arrangement continued until the territory was formally placed under the authority of the Commonwealth of Australia in 1902; the Papua Act 1905 subsequently provided for its government as an Australian territory.

Former external territories of Australia
| Current country and flag | Flag during administration | Former territory | Period | Status | Legislature | Autonomy | Notes |
|---|---|---|---|---|---|---|---|
| Papua New Guinea | | Territory of Papua | (1888-1902) (Note: A unique constitutional arrangement with the Imperial Administrator being guided by the Governor of Queensland but not subservient to the Governor. The Governor in turn as a designated person, acted outside his role as Governor, but was able to take advice from his government, but unlike his role as Governor of Queensland he was not bound by the advice of his ministers in relation to the Colony of Papua.); 1902–1949 | External territory (Administered on behalf of the British Crown 1902-1906) | Legislative Council, nominated and advisory from 1906 | None (Crown colony administration) | Formerly British New Guinea, under Imperial control but the guidance of the Queensland Governor. Transferred to Australian Commonwealth authority in 1902; the Papua Act 1905 provided for its government. |
| Papua New Guinea | | Territory of New Guinea | 1920–1949 | League of Nations mandate | Legislative Council (nominated and purely advisory, 1921–1949) | None (LoN Mandatory administration) | Formerly part of German New Guinea. Administered by Australia under mandate. The New Guinea Act 1920 provided for the form of Government. |
| Papua New Guinea | (Note: The Australian Blue Ensign was used for most purposes until mid-1971. The PNG National Flag was adopted on 1 July 1971 and became the preferred flag from that date, though the Australian flag retained precedence until independence in 1975.) | Territory of Papua and New Guinea | 1949–1975 | United Nations trust territory | Legislative Council of Papua and New Guinea (Largely appointed and advisory; 1951-1963); House of Assembly of Papua and New Guinea (1964-1975) | Limited self-government from 1973 until Independence | Administrative union of Papua and New Guinea after WWII. The territory was renamed Papua New Guinea by the Papua New Guinea Act 1971, before independence in 1975. The current flag was adopted on 1 July 1971. |
| Republic of Nauru | | Territory of Nauru | 1920–1968 | League of Nations mandate later United Nations trust territory | Council of Chiefs (advisory, 1927–1951); Nauru Local Government Council (elected but advisory, 1951–1992); Legislative Council (with elected majority, 1966–present) | Limited self-government from 1966 until independence | Formerly part of German New Guinea. Administered by Australia on behalf of itself, New Zealand, and the United Kingdom, first under mandate, then under trust. (Note: The League of Nations mandate for Nauru was conferred on 17 December 1920. The mandate was held jointly by Australia, New Zealand, and the United Kingdom, with Australia as the administering authority.) |

== Governance ==
=== Constitutional framework ===
The legislative powers of the states are protected by the Australian constitution, section 107, and under the principle of federalism, Commonwealth legislation only applies to the states where permitted by the constitution. The territories, by contrast, are from a constitutional perspective directly subject to the Commonwealth government; laws for territories are determined by the Australian Parliament.

Most of the territories are directly administered by the Commonwealth government, while two (the Northern Territory and the Australian Capital Territory) have some degree of self-government although less than that of the states. In the self-governing territories, the Australian Parliament retains the full power to legislate, and can override laws made by the territorial institutions, which it has done on rare occasions. For the purposes of Australian (and joint Australia-New Zealand) intergovernmental bodies, the Northern Territory and the Australian Capital Territory are treated as if they were states.

The Australian Capital Territory and the Northern Territory each elect two senators. The other territories do not have separate Senate representation. Residents of Christmas Island and the Cocos (Keeling) Islands vote in the Northern Territory electorate of Lingiari; Norfolk Island residents vote in the ACT electorate of Bean; and Jervis Bay Territory residents are included in the ACT. These territories are represented in the House of Representatives through mainland electorates rather than by separate territory members. Excluding the Heard and McDonald Islands and the Australian Antarctic Territory (which are governed by the Department of Climate Change, Energy, the Environment and Water), the external territories are governed by the federal Department of Infrastructure, Transport, Regional Development, Communications, Sport and the Arts. Norfolk Island had its own legislature from 1979 until 2015.

=== Governors and administrators ===
Each state has a governor, appointed by the monarch (currently Charles III), which by convention he does on the advice of the state premier. The Administrator of the Northern Territory, by contrast, is appointed by the governor-general. The Australian Capital Territory has neither a governor nor an administrator. Instead, since the enactment of the Australian Capital Territory (Self-Government) Act 1988 (Cth), the functions of the head of the Executive, commissioning government, proroguing parliament and enacting legislation, are exercised by the Assembly itself and by the chief minister.

| Post | Incumbent | Appointed |
|---|---|---|
| Governor of New South Wales | Margaret Beazley | 2 May 2019 |
| Governor of Victoria | Margaret Gardner | 9 August 2023 |
| Governor of Queensland | Jeannette Young (Note: Justice Thomas Bradley was appointed to succeed Dr Jeannette Young, effective 1 November 2026.) | 1 November 2021 |
| Governor of Western Australia | Chris Dawson | 15 July 2022 |
| Governor of South Australia | Frances Adamson (Note: Grant Stevens was appointed to succeed Frances Adamson, effective 9 December 2026.) | 7 October 2021 |
| Governor of Tasmania | Caroline Wells | 17 June 2026 |
| Administrator of the Northern Territory | David Connolly | 27 February 2026 |
| Administrator of Norfolk Island | Fiona McKergow | 1 June 2026 |
| Administrator of the Australian Indian Ocean Territories | Farzian Zainal | 1 June 2026 |

=== Premiers and chief ministers ===
The head of government of each state is called the "premier", appointed by the state's governor. In normal circumstances, the governor will appoint as premier whoever leads the party or coalition which exercises control of the lower house (in the case of Queensland, the only house) of the state parliament. However, in times of constitutional crisis, the governor can appoint someone else as premier. The head of government of the self-governing internal territories is called the "chief minister". The Northern Territory's chief minister, in normal circumstances whoever controls the legislative assembly, is appointed by the administrator.

| Post | Incumbent | Political party | Appointed |
|---|---|---|---|
| Premier of New South Wales | Chris Minns MP | Labor | 25 March 2023 |
| Premier of Victoria | Ben Carroll MP | Labor | 28 July 2026 |
| Premier of Queensland | David Crisafulli MP | Liberal National | 28 October 2024 |
| Premier of Western Australia | Roger Cook MLA | Labor | 8 June 2023 |
| Premier of South Australia | Peter Malinauskas MP | Labor | 21 March 2022 |
| Premier of Tasmania | Jeremy Rockliff MP | Liberal | 8 April 2022 |
| Chief Minister of the Australian Capital Territory | Andrew Barr MLA | Labor | 11 December 2014 |
| Chief Minister of the Northern Territory | Lia Finocchiaro MLA | Country Liberal | 28 August 2024 |

=== Parliaments and representative government ===
Each state has a bicameral parliament, except Queensland, which abolished its upper house in 1922. The lower house is called the "legislative assembly", except in South Australia and Tasmania, where it is called the "house of assembly". Tasmania is the only state to use proportional representation for elections to its lower house; all others elect members from single member constituencies, using preferential voting. The upper house is called the "legislative council" and is generally elected from multi-member constituencies using proportional representation. The ACT and the Northern Territory each have unicameral legislative assemblies. The legislative assembly for the ACT is the only parliament with responsibility for both state/territory and local government functions.

Legislatures and local government of the Australian states and territories
| Symbol | Jurisdiction | Legislature | Type | Upper house (seats) | Lower house (seats) | Electorates | Local government areas (2025) |
|---|---|---|---|---|---|---|---|
| | New South Wales | Parliament of New South Wales | Bicameral | Legislative Council (42) | Legislative Assembly (93) | 93 single-member districts | 128 councils (Note: Includes 120 local government areas and 8 unincorporated areas.) |
| | Victoria | Parliament of Victoria | Bicameral | Legislative Council (40) | Legislative Assembly (88) | 88 single-member districts | 79 councils |
| | Queensland | Parliament of Queensland | Unicameral | None (abolished 1922) | Legislative Assembly (93) | 93 single-member districts | 77 councils (Note: Includes 12 Aboriginal and Torres Strait Islander councils.) |
| | Western Australia | Parliament of Western Australia | Bicameral | Legislative Council (36) | Legislative Assembly (59) | 59 single-member districts | 137 local governments |
| | South Australia | Parliament of South Australia | Bicameral | Legislative Council (22) | House of Assembly (47) | 47 single-member districts | 68 councils |
| | Tasmania | Parliament of Tasmania | Bicameral | Legislative Council (15) | House of Assembly (35) | 5 multi-member divisions | 29 councils |
| | Australian Capital Territory | Legislative Assembly | Unicameral | None | Legislative Assembly (25) | 5 multi-member electorates | 0 (Note: The ACT has no separate local government system; the ACT Government performs these functions. Several community councils operate as non-political advocacy groups.) |
| | Northern Territory | Legislative Assembly | Unicameral | None | Legislative Assembly (25) | 25 single-member divisions | 16 councils (Note: Includes 5 municipal, 3 shire, and 10 regional councils, some of which are Aboriginal community government councils.) |
| | Norfolk Island | Norfolk Island Regional Council (Note: The Norfolk Island Regional Council is under administration, with Scott Mason (Lead Administrator) and Gary Mottau (Financial Administrator) appointed until 31 December 2026. A new Norfolk Island Assembly, comprising five elected members, is planned. The first stage will be a five-member Transition Assembly.) | Unicameral (local government) | None | Regional Council (5) | N/A (local government) | 1 council (under administration) |
| | Christmas Island | Shire of Christmas Island | Unicameral (local government) | None | Shire Council (9) | N/A (local government) | 1 shire |
| | Cocos (Keeling) Islands | Shire of Cocos (Keeling) Islands | Unicameral (local government) | None | Shire Council (7) | N/A (local government) | 1 shire |
| | Jervis Bay Territory | No legislature | — | — | — | — | 0 (Note: Administered directly by the Department of Infrastructure, Transport, Regional Development, Communications and the Arts. The Wreck Bay Aboriginal Community Council functions as the territory's de facto legislative body, exercising by-law-making power over 403 hectares of Aboriginal land under the Aboriginal Land Grant (Jervis Bay Territory) Act 1986.) |
| | Uninhabited territories (Note: The uninhabited external territories are the Australian Antarctic Territory, the Coral Sea Islands, Ashmore and Cartier Islands, and Heard Island and McDonald Islands.) | No legislature | — | — | — | — | 0 (Note: Administered by the Australian Antarctic Division (for the Australian Antarctic Territory and Heard Island and McDonald Islands) or the Department of Infrastructure (for the Coral Sea Islands and Ashmore and Cartier Islands).) |

=== Indigenous representative bodies ===
Several jurisdictions have dedicated Indigenous representative, electoral, or advisory bodies. These operate alongside the general state and territory parliaments and local government structures. The table below summarises the main bodies and their composition.

Indigenous representative bodies of the Australian states and territories
| Symbol and jurisdiction | Body | Type | Composition | Established | Notes |
|---|---|---|---|---|---|
| New South Wales | New South Wales Aboriginal Land Council (NSWALC) | Elected land council | 9 councillors (one per region) (Note: Elected by registered voting members of Local Aboriginal Land Councils. There are over 120 Local Aboriginal Land Councils across NSW.) | 1983 | Largest member-based Aboriginal organisation in Australia. |
| Victoria | First Peoples' Assembly of Victoria | Elected representative | 34 members (12 reserved seats, 22 general seats) | 2019 | Democratically elected body representing Traditional Owners in the Treaty process. |
| Queensland | Torres Strait Regional Authority (TSRA) | Elected representative | 20 elected members | 1994 | Commonwealth statutory authority for the Torres Strait region. |
| South Australia | South Australian First Nations Voice | Elected representative | 6 Local Voices + State Voice (Note: Each Local Voice elects two members to the State First Nations Voice.) | 2023 | First state-based elected Indigenous Voice to Parliament in Australia. |
| Tasmania | Aboriginal Land Council of Tasmania (ALCT) | Elected land council | 8 members | 1995 | Elected for a three-year term, representing five electoral areas. |
| Western Australia | Aboriginal Advisory Council of Western Australia (AACWA) | Advisory (appointed) | 12 members | 1995 | Appointed body providing advice to the WA Government on Aboriginal affairs. |
| Northern Territory | Central Land Council (CLC) | Elected land council | 90 members | 1976 | Covers the southern half of the NT, representing around 24,000 Aboriginal people. |
| Northern Territory | Northern Land Council (NLC) | Elected land council | 78 members | 1976 | Covers the Top End, including the Tiwi Islands and Groote Eylandt. |
| Northern Territory | Tiwi Land Council (TLC) | Elected land council | 24 members | 1978 | Represents the Tiwi people of Bathurst and Melville Islands. |
| Northern Territory | Anindilyakwa Land Council (ALC) | Elected land council | 12 members | 1991 | Represents the Anindilyakwa people of the Groote Archipelago. |

=== Courts ===
Each state and territory has its own Supreme Court, which is the highest court within that jurisdiction. The High Court of Australia is the final court of appeal for all Australian jurisdictions and hears appeals from state and territory Supreme Courts. Larger jurisdictions have a permanent Court of Appeal, while smaller jurisdictions constitute a Full Court or Court of Appeal on an ad hoc basis.

Supreme Courts of the Australian states and territories
| Symbol | Jurisdiction | Supreme Court | Head of jurisdiction | Judicial officers | Appellate structure |
|---|---|---|---|---|---|
| | New South Wales | Supreme Court of New South Wales | Chief Justice Andrew Bell | 61 (Note: Includes the Chief Justice, President of the Court of Appeal, 9 Judges of Appeal, 42 Judges, and associate and acting judges.) | Permanent Court of Appeal |
| | Victoria | Supreme Court of Victoria | Chief Justice Richard Niall | 32 (Note: Includes the Chief Justice, 9 Judges of Appeal, and 22 Trial Division judges.) | Permanent Court of Appeal |
| | Queensland | Supreme Court of Queensland | Chief Justice Helen Bowskill | 26 (Note: Includes the Chief Justice, 5 Court of Appeal judges, and 20 Trial Division judges.) | Permanent Court of Appeal |
| | Western Australia | Supreme Court of Western Australia | Chief Justice Peter Quinlan | 21 (Note: Includes the Chief Justice, judges of the Court of Appeal, and judges of the General Division.) | Permanent Court of Appeal |
| | South Australia | Supreme Court of South Australia | Chief Justice Chris Kourakis | 13 (Note: Includes the Chief Justice and 12 other judges.) | Full Court (ad hoc) |
| | Tasmania | Supreme Court of Tasmania | Chief Justice Alan Blow | 7 (Note: Maximum of 7 judges under the Supreme Court Act 1887; currently 6 judges constitute the Court.) | Full Court (ad hoc) |
| | Northern Territory | Supreme Court of the Northern Territory | Chief Justice Michael Grant | 6 (Note: Resident judges; additional and acting judges are appointed from time to time.) | Court of Appeal (ad hoc) |
| | Australian Capital Territory | Supreme Court of the Australian Capital Territory | Chief Justice Lucy McCallum | 6 (Note: Includes the Chief Justice and 5 resident judges. Additional judges from the Federal Court assist from time to time.) | Court of Appeal (ad hoc) |
| | Norfolk Island | Supreme Court of Norfolk Island | Chief Justice Robert Bromwich | Chief Justice and other judges appointed by the Governor-General | Appeals to the Federal Court of Australia |

Residents of the Jervis Bay Territory fall within the jurisdiction of the Supreme Court of the Australian Capital Territory. External territories have varied judicial arrangements, with most subject to the courts of a state or internal territory.

=== Police ===
Each state and the Northern Territory has its own police force. The Australian Capital Territory is policed by ACT Policing, a business unit of the Australian Federal Police (AFP), under a purchase agreement with the ACT Government. The AFP also provides policing services to the external territories.

Police forces of the Australian states and territories
| Jurisdiction | Police force | Commissioner / Chief Officer | Sworn officers | Total staff |
|---|---|---|---|---|
| New South Wales | NSW Police Force | Commissioner Mal Lanyon (Note: Mal Lanyon was appointed the 24th Commissioner on 1 October 2025 for a five-year term.) | ~16,000 (Note: More than 16,000 sworn officers; authorised strength is 18,398.) | ~20,600 |
| Victoria | Victoria Police | Chief Commissioner Mike Bush (Note: Mike Bush commenced his term as the 24th Chief Commissioner on 27 June 2025 for a five-year term.) | ~15,500 (Note: 15,463 sworn officers as at March 2026, down from 16,191 in June 2024. The force has shed 728 full-time officers over that period.) | ~21,300 |
| Queensland | Queensland Police Service | Acting Commissioner Brett Pointing (Note: Brett Pointing was appointed Acting Commissioner from 21 February 2026 for a 12-month interim period following the retirement of Commissioner Steve Gollschewski.) | 13,011 (Note: Sworn officer numbers surpassed 13,000 for the first time in Queensland's history in 2026.) | ~19,600 |
| Western Australia | Western Australia Police Force | Commissioner Col Blanch (Note: Col Blanch was appointed the 23rd Commissioner effective 15 July 2022 for a five-year term.) | 7,145 (Note: 7,401 headcount and 7,144.94 FTE police officers as at 7 May 2026.) | ~8,000 |
| South Australia | South Australia Police | Commissioner Grant Stevens (Note: Grant Stevens was appointed Governor of South Australia in October 2026, effective 9 December 2026. He will formally step down as Commissioner on 23 October 2026, with Deputy Commissioner Linda Williams to assume the role in an acting capacity.) | 4,674 (Note: 4,674.2 sworn officers as at May 2026, with a target of 5,000 by 2030-31.) | ~6,300 |
| Tasmania | Tasmania Police | Commissioner Donna Adams (Note: Donna Adams commenced as Tasmania's 15th Commissioner of Police and Secretary of the Department of Police, Fire and Emergency Management on 11 October 2022.) | ~1,450 (Note: Approximately 1,450 active police officers as at February 2026.) | 1,555 |
| Northern Territory | Northern Territory Police Force | Commissioner Martin Dole (Note: Martin Dole was commissioned as the 15th Commissioner on 31 October 2025 for a term ending in 2029.) | 1,782 (Note: 1,782.33 FTE sworn officers as at 25 March 2026. The defined establishment is 1,844.) | ~2,200 |
| Australian Capital Territory | ACT Policing (Note: ACT Policing is a business unit of the Australian Federal Police, which provides community policing services to the ACT under a purchase agreement with the ACT Government.) | Chief Police Officer Scott Lee (Note: Scott Lee serves as a Deputy Commissioner of the AFP and Chief Police Officer for the ACT. He was appointed in March 2024.) | ~606 (Note: Approximately 606 sworn officers. ACT Policing has 169 sworn officers per 100,000 people, the lowest police density in the nation.) | 1,041 |
| External territories (Note: The Australian Federal Police provides policing services to Christmas Island, the Cocos (Keeling) Islands, Norfolk Island, and the Jervis Bay Territory.) | Australian Federal Police (AFP) | Commissioner Krissy Barrett (Note: Krissy Barrett became the ninth Commissioner of the AFP and the first woman to lead the force on 4 October 2025.) | 3,578 (Note: AFP total staff as at 30 June 2025 was 8,328, comprising 3,578 police officers, 838 protective service officers, and 3,912 unsworn staff.) | 8,328 |

=== Comparative terminology ===
| Entity | Type of entity | Tie to the monarch | Domestic administrator | Head of government | Upper House of Parliament | Lower House of Parliament | Member of Parliament | |
| Entity | Type of entity | Tie to the monarch | Domestic administrator | Head of government | Upper House of Parliament | Lower House of Parliament | Upper house | Lower house (Note: The abbreviations MLA and MHA were previously the acceptable term for members of lower houses in states that now use MP.) |
|---|---|---|---|---|---|---|---|---|
| Commonwealth of Australia | Federal government | Direct | Governor-general | Prime minister | Senate | House of Representatives | Senator | MP |
| South Australia | Federated state | Direct (established by the Australia Act 1986) | Governor | Premier | Legislative Council | House of Assembly | MLC | MP |
| Tasmania | Federated state | Direct (established by the Australia Act 1986) | Governor | Premier | Legislative Council | House of Assembly | MLC | MP |
| New South Wales | Federated state | Direct (established by the Australia Act 1986) | Governor | Premier | Legislative Council | Legislative Assembly | MLC | MP |
| Victoria | Federated state | Direct (established by the Australia Act 1986) | Governor | Premier | Legislative Council | Legislative Assembly | MLC | MP |
| Western Australia | Federated state | Direct (established by the Australia Act 1986) | Governor | Premier | Legislative Council | Legislative Assembly | MLC | MLA |
| Queensland | Federated state | Direct (established by the Australia Act 1986) | Governor | Premier | N/A (abolished 1922) | Legislative Assembly | —N/a | MP |
| Australian Capital Territory | Self-governing territory | Indirect (through the governor-general) | Assembly and chief minister | Chief minister | —N/a | Legislative Assembly | —N/a | MLA |
| Northern Territory | Self-governing territory | Indirect (through the governor-general) | Administrator | Chief minister | —N/a | Legislative Assembly | —N/a | MLA |
| Christmas Island | External territory | Indirect (through the governor-general) | Administrator | Shire president | —N/a | Shire Council | —N/a | Councillor |
| Cocos (Keeling) Islands | External territory | Indirect (through the governor-general) | Administrator | Shire president | —N/a | Shire Council | —N/a | Councillor |
| Norfolk Island | External territory | Indirect (through the governor-general) | Administrator | Lead Administrator (Note: The Norfolk Island Regional Council is under administration and has no elected mayor.) | —N/a | Regional Council (Note: Between 1979 and 2015 Norfolk Island was a self-governing external territory with its own legislature, the Norfolk Island Legislative Assembly, until this was abolished by the Commonwealth Parliament in 2015. The Regional Council was established in 2016 but was suspended in 2020 and placed under administration.) | —N/a | Councillor |

== Statistics ==
The majority of Australians live in the eastern coastal mainland states of New South Wales, Queensland, Victoria, and the Australian Capital Territory, which collectively form 79 per cent of the entire population of Australia. Most of the major population centres are located east and south of the Great Dividing Range on the coastal plains and their associated hinterland regions.

Population density figures in the table below are drawn from Australian Bureau of Statistics estimates for March 2026, consistent with the state and territory tables above. The "In capital" percentages are derived from the 2021 Census, the most recent census for which place-of-usual-residence data is available.

Area, density and population concentration of the Australian states and territories
| State / territory | Land area km² • sq mi • Rank | | | Marine area km² • sq mi • Rank | | | Total area km² • sq mi • Rank | | | Population density /km² • /sq mi • Rank | | | In capital % • Rank | |
|---|---|---|---|---|---|---|---|---|---|---|---|---|---|---|
| New South Wales | 801,150 | 309,330 | 5 | 8,802 | 3,398 | 7 | 809,952 | 312,724 | 5 | 10.82 | 28.0 | 3 | 63.0% | 5 |
| Victoria | 227,444 | 87,817 | 6 | 10,213 | 3,943 | 6 | 237,657 | 91,760 | 6 | 31.46 | 81.5 | 2 | 71.0% | 4 |
| Queensland | 1,729,742 | 667,857 | 2 | 121,994 | 47,102 | 1 | 1,914,736 | 739,284 | 2 | 3.32 | 8.6 | 5 | 46.0% | 7 |
| Western Australia | 2,527,013 | 975,685 | 1 | 115,740 | 44,690 | 2 | 2,642,753 | 1,020,373 | 1 | 1.23 | 3.2 | 7 | 73.4% | 3 |
| South Australia | 984,321 | 380,048 | 4 | 60,032 | 23,178 | 4 | 1,044,353 | 403,227 | 4 | 1.95 | 5.1 | 6 | 73.5% | 2 |
| Tasmania | 68,401 | 26,410 | 7 | 22,357 | 8,632 | 5 | 90,758 | 35,042 | 7 | 8.49 | 22.0 | 4 | 41.0% | 8 |
| Australian Capital Territory | 2,358 | 910 | 8 | 0 | 0 | 8 | 2,358 | 910 | 8 | 207.7 | 538 | 1 | 99.6% | 1 |
| Northern Territory | 1,347,791 | 520,385 | 3 | 71,839 | 27,737 | 3 | 1,419,630 | 548,120 | 3 | 0.20 | 0.52 | 8 | 54.0% | 6 |

== Geography and borders ==
Australia is separated from Maritime Southeast Asia and New Guinea by the Arafura Sea, the Timor Sea, and the Torres Strait, from Island Melanesia by the Coral Sea, and from New Zealand by the Tasman Sea. The world's smallest continent, Australia is also the sixth-largest country by land area. Australia has a mainland coastline of 32,994 kilometres (20,502 mi) and claims an exclusive economic zone of about 8,200,000 square kilometres (3,200,000 sq mi).

The term interstate is used within Australia to refer to a number of events, transactions, registrations, travel, etc. which occurs across borders or outside of the particular state or territory of the user of the term. Examples of use include motor vehicle registration, travel, applications to educational institutions out of one's home state.

There are very few urban areas bifurcated by state or territory borders. The Queensland-New South Wales border runs through Coolangatta (Queensland) and Tweed Heads (New South Wales) and splits Gold Coast Airport. Oaks Estate, a contiguous residential of Queanbeyan, was excised out of New South Wales when the Australian Capital Territory was established in 1909. Some Urban Centres and Localities reported by the Australian Bureau of Statistics include some agglomerations of cities spreading across state borders, including Gold Coast–Tweed Heads, Canberra–Queanbeyan, Albury–Wodonga (New South Wales-Victoria) and Mildura–Wentworth (Victoria-New South Wales)

=== Borders ===
- Australian Capital Territory borders
- New South Wales borders
- Northern Territory borders
- Queensland borders
- South Australian borders
- Tasmanian borders
- Victorian borders
- Western Australian borders

== State and territory codes ==
| State/territory | Abbrev. | Call signs | | | Postal | | Telephone numbers in Australia | Time zone | |
| State/territory | Abbrev. | AM/FM | TV | Amateur | Abbrev. | Postcode | Telephone numbers in Australia | Std | Summer |
|---|---|---|---|---|---|---|---|---|---|
| New South Wales | NSW | 2xx(x) | xx(x)Nn | VK2xx | NSW | 1nnn, (Note: This is used for some PO box and large users only.) 2nnn | +61 2 xxxx xxxx (Note: Some exceptions apply to numbers in this state's number range.) | +10 (+9 1/2 +10 1/2) (Note: The state of New South Wales observes Australian Eastern Standard Time except for Broken Hill and the surrounding region, which observes Australian Central Standard Time and Lord Howe Island which is 30 minutes ahead of Australian Eastern Standard Time.) | +11 (+10 1/2) (Note: Broken Hill and surrounding region observe Australian Central Summer Time. Lord Howe Island adopts Australian Eastern Summer Time.) |
| Victoria | Vic | 3xx(x) | xx(x)Vn | VK3xx | VIC | 3nnn, 8nnn | +61 3 xxxx xxxx | +10 | +11 |
| Queensland | Qld | 4xx(x) | xx(x)Qn | VK4xx | QLD | 4nnn, 9nnn | +61 7 xxxx xxxx | +10 | |
| Western Australia | WA | 6xx(x) | xx(x)Wn | VK6xx | WA | 6nnn | +61 8 9xxx xxxx +61 8 6xxx xxxx | +8 | |
| South Australia | SA | 5xx(x) | xx(x)Sn | VK5xx | SA | 5nnn | +61 8 8xxx xxxx +61 8 7xxx xxxx | +9 1/2 | +10 1/2 |
| Tasmania | Tas | 7xx(x) | xx(x)Tn | VK7xx | TAS | 7nnn | +61 3 6xxx xxxx | +10 | +11 |
| Australian Capital Territory | ACT | 1xx(x) (Note: A number of broadcast stations in the ACT have call signs allocated as if ACT were part of New South Wales.) | xx(x)Cn | VK1xx | ACT | 02nn, 26nn, 29nn | +61 2 62xx xxxx +61 2 61xx xxxx | +10 | +11 |
| Northern Territory | NT | 8xx(x) | xx(x)Dn | VK8xx | NT | 08nn | +61 8 89xx xxxx | +9 1/2 | |
| Jervis Bay Territory | JBT | 2xx(x) | xx(x)Nn | VK2xx | ACT | 2540 | +61 2 44xx xxxx | +10 | +11 |
External territories
| Christmas Island | | 6xx(x) | xx(x)Wn | VK9xx | WA | 6798 | +61 8 9164 xxxx | +7 | |
| Norfolk Island | | 2xx(x) | xx(x)Nn | VK2xx | NSW | 2899 | +672 3 xx xxx | +11 | +12 |
| Cocos (Keeling) Islands | | 6xx(x) | xx(x)Wn | VK9xx | WA | 6799 | +61 8 9162 xxxx | +6 1/2 | |
| Australian Antarctic Territory | AAT | none | | VK0xx | TAS | 7151 | +672 1 | +6 to +8 | |
| Coral Sea Islands | | None | | | QLD | —N/a | —N/a | None | |
| Ashmore and Cartier Islands | | None | | | —N/a | —N/a | —N/a | +8 | |
| Heard Island and McDonald Islands | | None | | | TAS | 7151 | —N/a | +5 | |

== See also ==
- Australian regional rivalries
- ISO 3166-2:AU, the ISO codes for the states and territories of Australia
- List of adjectival and demonymic forms of Australian states and territories
- List of Australian states and territories by Human Development Index
- List of symbols of states and territories of Australia
- Proposals for new Australian states
