= Cape St George Lighthouse =

Lighthouse in the Jervis Bay Territory, Australia

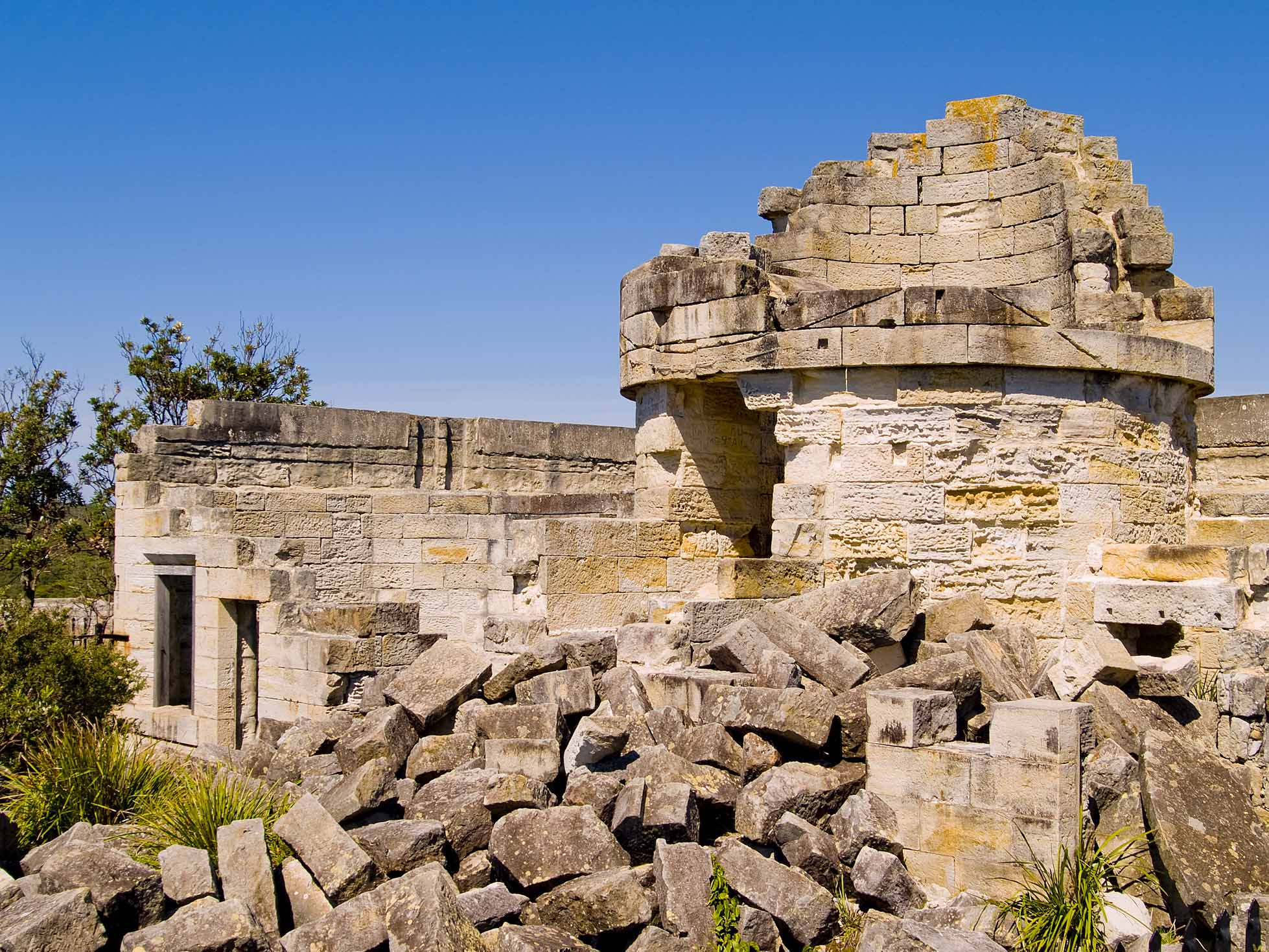
- Ruins of Cape St George Lighthouse, 2008
- Location: Jervis Bay Village, Jervis Bay Territory, Australia
- Coordinates: 35°9′7″S 150°45′41″E

Tower
- Constructed: 1860
- Foundation: Sydney sandstone
- Construction: Limestone tower
- Shape: Cylindrical tower

Light
- Deactivated: 1899

Commonwealth Heritage List
- Official name: Cape St George Lighthouse Ruins & Curtilage, Stony Creek Rd, Jervis Bay, ACT, Australia
- Type: Historic
- Criteria: A.4., C.1., E.1
- Designated: 22 June 2004
- Reference no.: 105312

Register of the National Estate
- Official name: Cape St George Lighthouse Ruins & Curtilage
- Type: Historic
- Criteria: A.4., C.1., E.1
- Designated: 21 October 1980
- Reference no.: 13628

Cape St George Lighthouse was a lighthouse that stood near Jervis Bay Village, Jervis Bay Territory, Australia. It was located about 3 kilometres (1.9 mi) south of the southern entrance to Jervis Bay. Constructed in 1860 it was active until 1889. The tower was destroyed between 1917–1922 to avoid confusion in daylight. The ruins remain and are listed on the Commonwealth Heritage List.

== History ==
The recommendation to build a lighthouse on the vicinity was made in 1856. However, despite the fact that the Pilots Board, which was the controlling authority, was not consulted, £5000 were allocated and a tender was accepted.

Controversy started even before construction, when the Board received numerous communications and reports questioning the angles of visibility of the site from the north and south and its proposed and actual locations, which proved to be five miles apart.

Finally, when the Pilots Board examined the site, they reported that the initial map prepared by Millington and Dawson suffered from "discrepancies of so grave a character that it is impossible to decide whether either position marked on the map really exists." They also questioned whether the facility will be visible from the required approaches. Nevertheless, despite these facts and further disagreement by a majority of the Board, the lighthouse was commissioned on 1 October 1860.

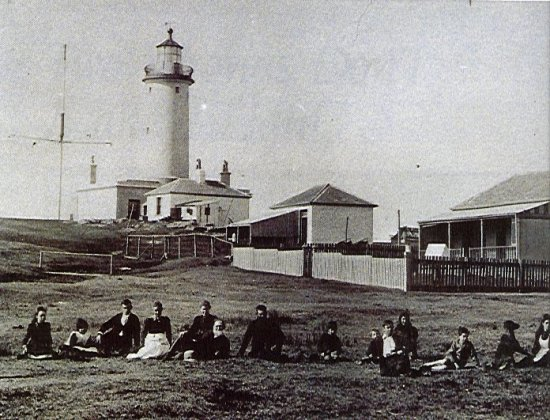
Historic view of the lighthouse

The resulting light was not visible from the northern approach to Jervis Bay, and was barely visible from the southern approach. When inspected by members of the Pilots Board it was found that on top of the inaccuracies, the contractor built the light 2.5 miles (4.0 km) north of the intended site, as it was closer to the quarry he was obtaining the stone from.

Later, a Select Committee was appointed by the New South Wales Government to investigate the errors in locating the lighthouse. The committee found out the Board had been grossly negligent in approving a location without prior inspection and in relying on maps of dubious accuracy. In conclusions it reported that "errors - very grave errors, highly censurable - have been committed in the erection of this lighthouse."

From 1864 to 1893 there were twenty three ships wrecked on the South Coast of New South Wales in the vicinity of Jervis Bay. The light was eventually replaced in 1899 by Point Perpendicular Light in Point Perpendicular, a much more suitable location for a lighthouse on this part of the coast. The lantern was removed and later used in the Crookhaven Heads Light, built in 1904.

After the commissioning of the new light, it was considered that the confusion of having two towers in close proximity to one another would be a hazardous to navigation in daylight, especially during foul weather. As a result, the Cape St George Tower was unceremoniously used from 1917 to 1922 for target practice by the Royal Australian Navy and destroyed.

== Heritage listing ==
On 22 June 2004 the lighthouse ruins were listed on the Commonwealth Heritage List with the following statement of significance:

The Cape St George Lighthouse ruins, built in 1859, are significant for their association with the development and establishment of navigational aids along the Australian coastline. Its construction is associated with the 1856 Lighthouse Commission which created the first Inter-colonial Agreement on the provision of lights around Australia (Criterion A.4). The ruins of the lighthouse and associated buildings are significant as an integral part of Australia's maritime history, because of their original incorrect siting. The ruins, despite their short working life, are significant for providing important information in the interpretation and understanding of an important phase in Australia's history (Criteria A.4 and C.1). The ruins, situated on a high clifftop, are significant for their aesthetic value. The fact that the lighthouse was incorrectly sited, the subsequent abandonment of the place and its reduction to a ruin add to its historical and landmark significance (Criterion E.1). The Lighthouse ruins are of historical significance as evidence of the settlement around it, which was the first on the Bherarerre Peninsula (Criterion A.4).

— Statement of significance, Commonwealth Heritage List.

On 21 October 1980 the lighthouse ruins were listed on the (now defunct) Register of the National Estate.

== Tragedies ==
The ill fate of the lighthouse affected the lighthouse staff and their families.

In July 1887, Harriet Parker, daughter of the Assistant light keepers, was accidentally shot dead by Kate Gibson, the Chief Keeper's daughter. The jury of the ensuing Coronial inquiry stated that Harriet had died "from a gunshot wound accidentally received, and that Kate Gibson was not to blame as they were skylarking ..." Harriet Parker's grave can be found in the nearby Greenpatch Camping Area. In an incredible coincidence, in the same year of 1887, another woman called Kate Gibson (married to Nils Gibson, the lighthouse keeper of Bustard Head in Queensland) was found with her throat slashed open from ear to ear. The second Kate's death was ruled at the time a suicide, and she was buried in the cemetery at Bustard Head.

In 1895, Edward Bailey, the Chief Lighthouse Keeper, drowned while fishing 3 kilometres (1.9 mi) south of the lighthouse, leaving a large family of eleven children. He was washed off the rocks and was believed to have been taken by sharks. His son Arthur took over from him and reared his brothers and sisters. Another son, also named Arthur, became the Head Lighthouse keeper at Point Perpendicular Light when it opened in 1899.

== Site operation ==
The site is managed by the Wreck Bay Aboriginal Community and by the Department of the Environment, Water, Heritage and the Arts as part of the Booderee National Park.

== Visiting ==
The park service has stabilized the ruins against further decay. The ruins are located off Stony Creek Road, a gravel park road, about 16 kilometres (9.9 mi) southeast of Jervis Bay Village. Parking is provided nearby, and the grounds are accessible, though the ruins themselves are closed.

== See also ==
- List of lighthouses in Australia
