= Jervis Bay =

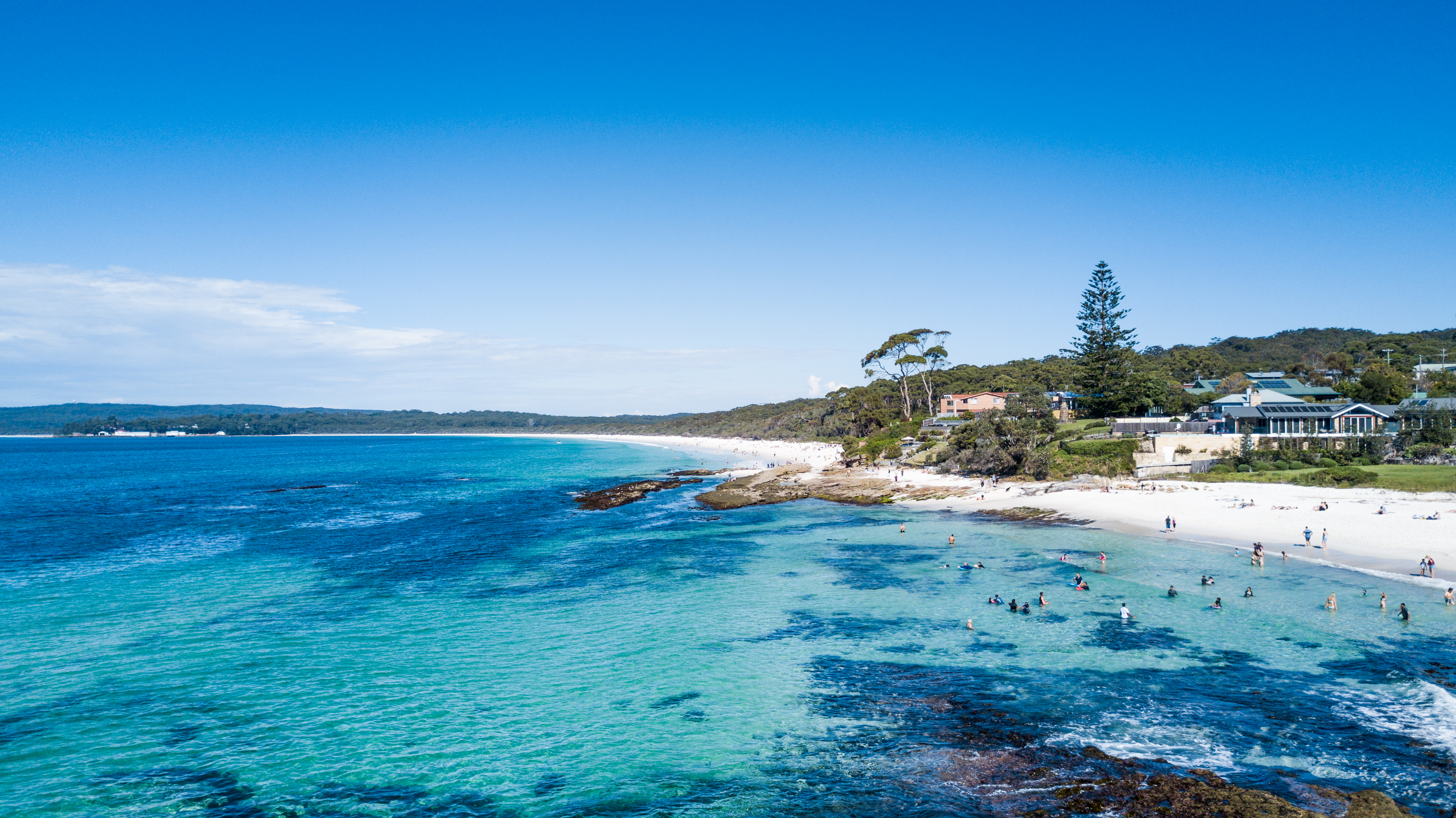
- Hyams Beach, Booderee National Park & the Jervis Bay Marine Park

- Location off the coast of New South Wales

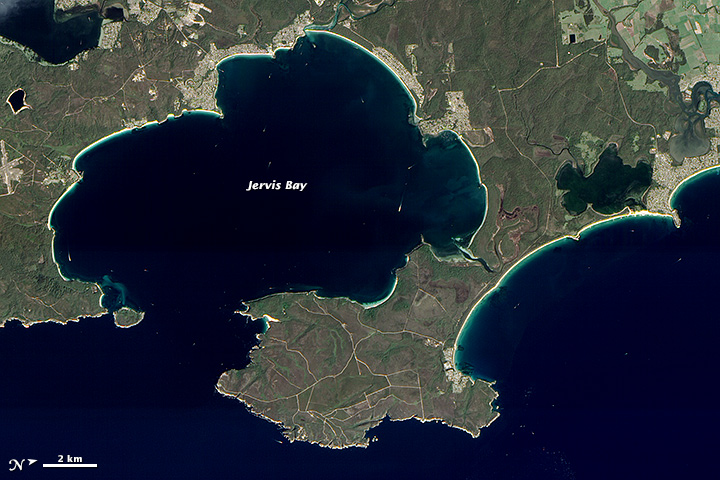
- Jervis Bay from orbit
- Location: Jervis Bay Territory, New South Wales
- Coordinates: 35°03′55″S 150°44′05″E
- Type: Oceanic bay
- Primary outflows: Tasman Sea
- Basin countries: Australia

Jervis Bay (/ˈdʒɜːrvɪs, ˈdʒɑːr-/) is a 102-square-kilometre (39 sq mi) oceanic bay and village in the Jervis Bay Territory and on the South Coast of New South Wales, Australia.

A 70-square-kilometre (27 sq mi) area of land around the southern headland of the bay, known as the Jervis Bay Territory, is not a part of the Australian Capital Territory (though some services are shared). The Territory includes the settlements of Jervis Bay Village and Wreck Bay Village. The Royal Australian Navy (RAN) base, HMAS Creswell, is in the Jervis Bay Territory between Jervis Bay Village and Greenpatch Point.

== History ==
Archaeological finds at Burrill Lake, 55 kilometres south of Jervis Bay, provide evidence of Aboriginal occupation dating back 20,000 years. In the Dhurga language, spoken by local Aboriginal inhabitants, the bay was known as "Booderee", meaning "bay of plenty".

Jervis Bay was sighted by Lieutenant James Cook aboard HMS Endeavour on 25 April 1770, two days after Saint George's Day, and he named the southern headland Cape St George.

In August 1791, Lieutenant Richard Bowen, aboard the convict transport ship Atlantic, part of the Third Fleet, sailed into the bay and named it in honour of Admiral John Jervis, under whom he had served. In November 1791 Master Matthew Weatherhead entered the bay aboard Matilda, which had also been part of the Third Fleet, in order to undertake repairs to the ship.

In mid 1797, survivors of the wreck of Sydney Cove passed through the area on foot, while undertaking an arduous trek of 600 kilometres in an attempt to get to Port Jackson (Sydney) – only three of them completed the journey.

Explorer George Bass entered the bay on 10 December 1797 and named Bowen Island.

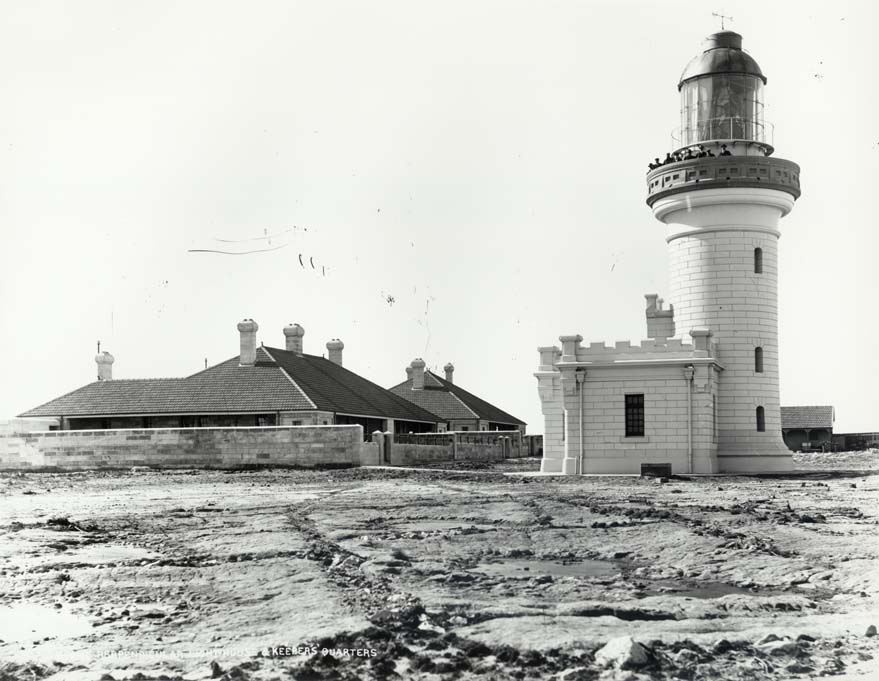
The Point Perpendicular Lighthouse in 1899

Alexander Berry's takeover of land in Shoalhaven displaced the Aboriginal inhabitants, who were moved to Wreck Bay in 1822. Smallpox and syphilis significantly reduced their population. A separate population of Aboriginal people, whom settlers called "the Jervis Bay tribe" – the Wandandian people – remained on their traditional lands on the bank of Currambene Creek, near Huskisson, and around St Georges Basin, until well into the 20th century.

In 1841, the private township of South Huskisson on Jervis Bay was founded as a seaport and terminus of The Wool Road. It was renamed Vincentia in 1952.

The bay was a base for whaling in 1912 and 1913. The vessels involved were the factory ship Loch Tay and her two catchers Campbell and Sorrell.

In 1915, the land now comprising the Jervis Bay Territory was surrendered to the Commonwealth Government by the state of New South Wales. It was proposed that it would become a seaport for the new federal capital under construction at Canberra, which would be Australia's only inland capital.

In the late 1960s, Australia's first nuclear power plant was proposed for the area, and a site was prepared, but the project did not proceed. This was in part because the local trade union peak body, South Coast Trades and Labour Council, stated that its members would not take part in the project.

In 1995, Jervis Bay National Park and Botanic Gardens were handed back to the Wreck Bay Aboriginal community. In 1997, the community, who jointly manage the park with the Commonwealth Government, decided to rename it Booderee National Park and Botanic Gardens.

== Geography ==
=== Geology ===
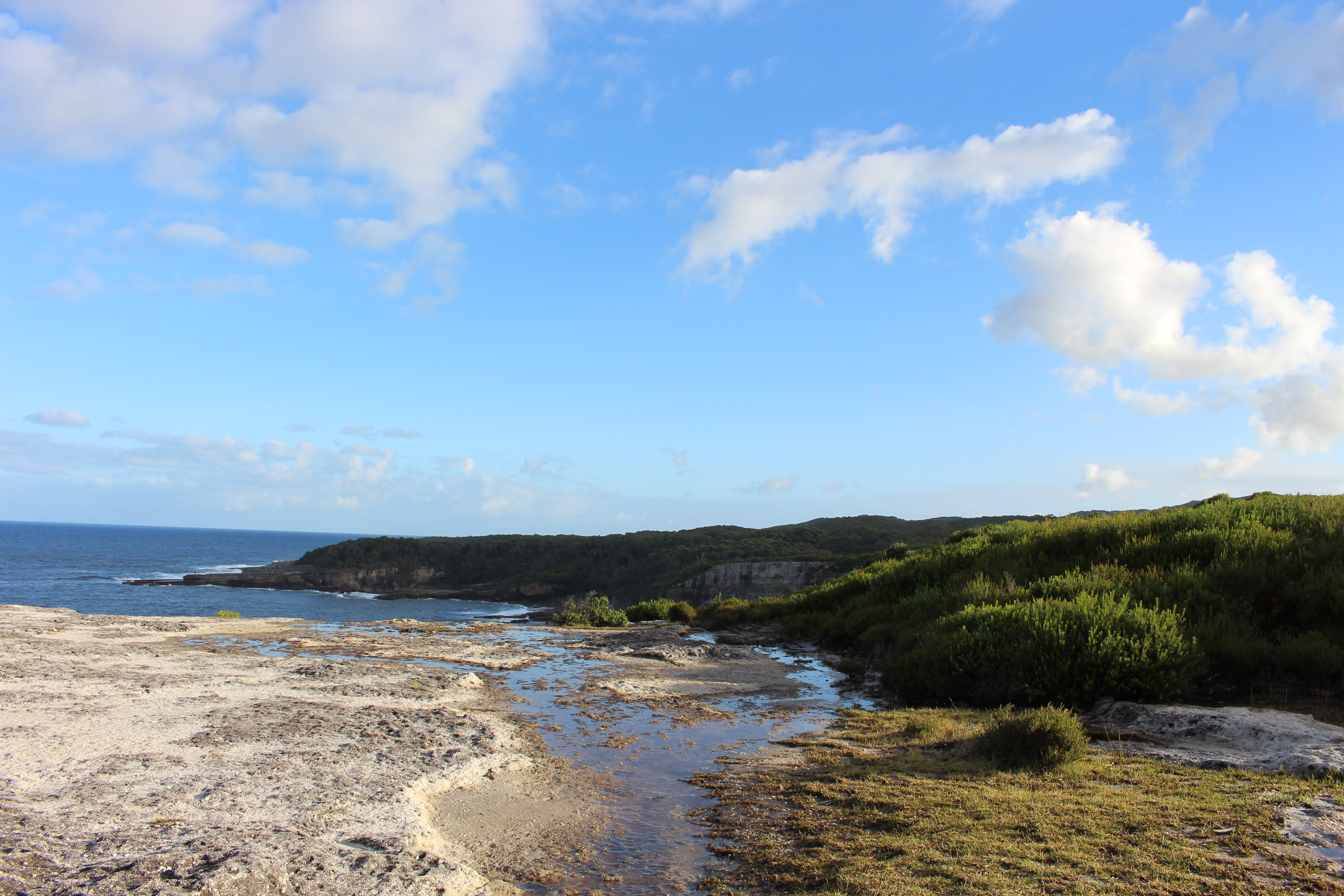
Cliff faces and vegetation at the Booderee National Park

Jervis Bay is a drowned river valley and formed 15,000 years ago, at the end of the last ice age. The bay took on its present appearance around 4000 BC after the sea levels had risen 120 metres (390 ft), and as sand dune barriers created the southern peninsula. Much of the rock in Jervis Bay is part of the Sydney Basin sandstone formation, which is 280–225 million years old, although lower areas are overlain with Tertiary-era sediments.

Several features at Jervis Bay have been used as evidence that the Australian coast experienced many giant tsunamis prior to European colonisation.

=== Description ===
In the Jervis Bay Territory on the southern side of the bay are the settlements of Greenpatch, Hyams Beach, and Bowen Island. From north to south on the New South Wales shore of the bay are Callala Beach, Callala Bay, Huskisson and Vincentia. Beecroft Peninsula, on the northern side of the bay, has been used as a bombing range by the RAN. Point Perpendicular forms the southern end of the peninsula. Jervis Bay is approximately a three-hour drive south of Sydney. A door-to-door shuttle service is available between Sydney Airport and the South Coast every day.

== Environment and protected areas ==
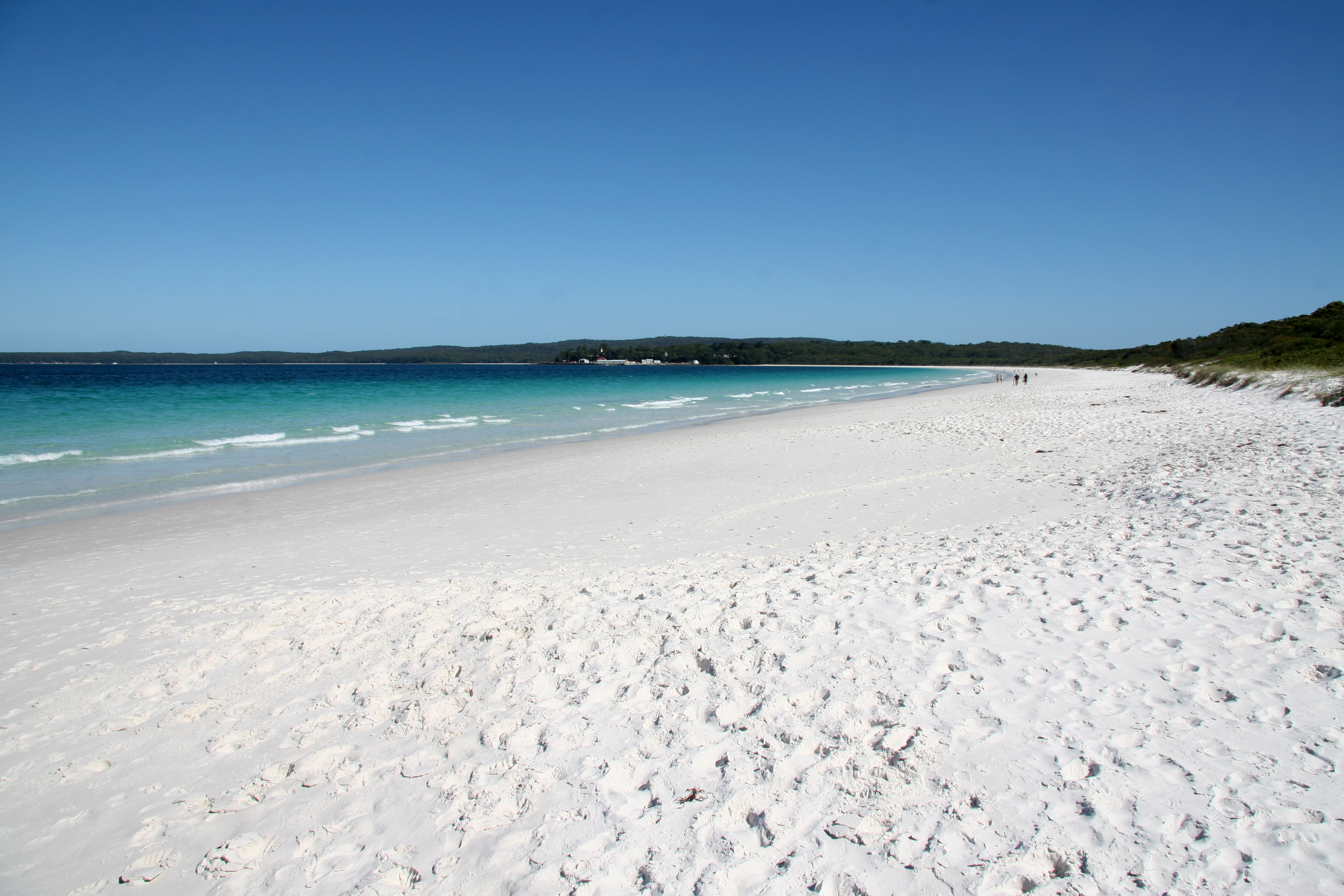
Hyams Beach, a white sandy beach

Significant areas of the Jervis Bay natural environment have been established as protected areas, including Booderee National Park, Jervis Bay National Park (NSW) and the Jervis Bay Marine Park.

Some 158 km^{2} (61 sq mi) of the land on both sides of the bay have been identified by BirdLife International as an Important Bird Area (IBA) because the coastal heathland supports the largest sub-population of the endangered eastern bristlebird, isolated from other sub-populations.

Jervis Bay has been recorded as having the whitest sand in the world.

== Recreation ==
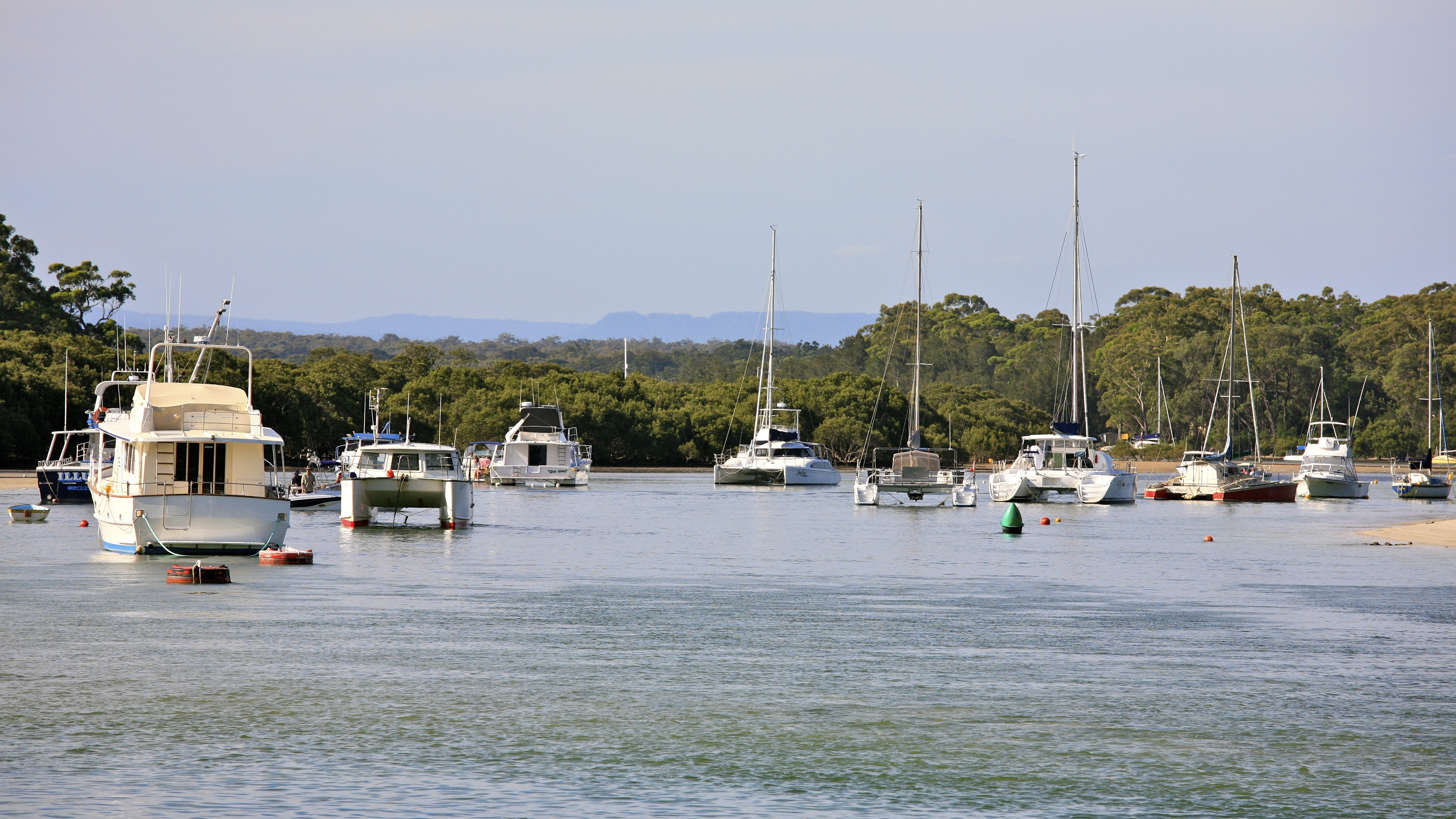
Recreational boats at Huskisson

Jervis Bay is known for recreational fishing, kayaking, paddleboarding, sailing and scuba diving, with tour operators departing from Huskisson and amateurs using boat ramps at bayside towns and camp sites. Popular diving sites include The Labyrinths, Gorgonian Wall, Point Perpendicular, a submerged Fairey Firefly aeroplane, scallop beds, Middle Ground, Ten Fathom Reef, and Bowen Island.

== Tourism ==
Tourism in Jervis Bay is one of the most important avenues of income for many of the local residents, with many businesses orienting themselves towards it. The Jervis Bay Visitors Information Centre is at Huskisson, and is part of the Lady Denman Maritime Museum and Gallery. Local council-managed visitor information centres are at Nowra and Ulladulla.

== Aquaculture ==
The first commercial aquaculture licence for an area in the bay was granted in 2015, for an enterprise which started growing blue mussels. They also found abundant Angasi oysters and scallops growing on the lines which they dropped at first, but the industry focus is on the blue mussels, which have a high ratio of meat to shell. The first full-scale commercial harvest of blue mussels was scheduled for November 2020. The potential of growing seaweeds for commercial use is also being explored, and Shoalhaven City Council is investing A$2.3 million to develop a wharf, boat maintenance facility and other infrastructure needed to service the industry. It is hoped that the industry will create up to 1,000 jobs.

== Climate ==
Jervis Bay experiences an oceanic climate (Köppen climate classification: Cfb), with average maximum temperatures varying from 16 °C in winter to 25 °C in summer tempered by sea breezes. Since 2001, the highest recorded temperature is 42.1 °C on 1 January 2006, and the lowest 4.7 °C on 13 August 2005. Hot summer evenings are often relieved by a front of rapidly moving cool air known as a southerly buster.

Rainfall is fairly evenly distributed throughout the seasons, with a bias to the first half of the year, due to prevailing easterlies. Short high intensity rainfall events may happen at any time of the year and can lead to local flooding. Jervis Bay also experiences thunderstorms during the warmer months bringing lightning, heavy rain and occasionally hail. With an annual rainfall around 1,200 mm, it is wetter than other areas in the South Coast due to its exposed eastward location on a peninsula facing the Tasman Sea, thus making it more susceptible to moist easterly flows. Yearly rainfall is influenced by the El Niño-Southern Oscillation.

Climate data for Jervis Bay (Point Perpendicular Lighthouse); 2001–2023, record lows; 1907–present
Month	Jan	Feb	Mar	Apr	May	Jun	Jul	Aug	Sep	Oct	Nov	Dec	Year
Record high °C (°F)	42.1 (107.8)	38.3 (100.9)	37.4 (99.3)	32.3 (90.1)	26.1 (79.0)	23.2 (73.8)	25.4 (77.7)	25.7 (78.3)	32.6 (90.7)	35.7 (96.3)	38.9 (102.0)	36.1 (97.0)	42.1 (107.8)
Mean daily maximum °C (°F)	25.0 (77.0)	24.3 (75.7)	23.5 (74.3)	21.5 (70.7)	18.8 (65.8)	16.6 (61.9)	16.1 (61.0)	17.0 (62.6)	19.2 (66.6)	20.9 (69.6)	22.2 (72.0)	23.5 (74.3)	20.7 (69.3)
Mean daily minimum °C (°F)	18.6 (65.5)	18.6 (65.5)	17.7 (63.9)	15.4 (59.7)	12.7 (54.9)	11.0 (51.8)	10.0 (50.0)	10.3 (50.5)	12.0 (53.6)	13.7 (56.7)	15.3 (59.5)	16.9 (62.4)	14.4 (57.9)
Record low °C (°F)	9.5 (49.1)	8.0 (46.4)	7.8 (46.0)	5.6 (42.1)	5.0 (41.0)	−0.5 (31.1)	1.5 (34.7)	−0.4 (31.3)	1.7 (35.1)	5.0 (41.0)	2.7 (36.9)	7.8 (46.0)	−0.5 (31.1)
Average rainfall mm (inches)	94.7 (3.73)	145.0 (5.71)	143.3 (5.64)	140.0 (5.51)	112.1 (4.41)	151.1 (5.95)	111.6 (4.39)	77.5 (3.05)	63.3 (2.49)	84.3 (3.32)	83.0 (3.27)	77.8 (3.06)	1,282.2 (50.48)
Average rainy days	11.3	12.9	14.1	13.7	10.1	11.5	10.1	9.0	9.8	12.1	12.0	12.4	139.0
Source 1: Bureau of Meteorology
Source 2: Bureau of Meteorology (record lows)

== See also ==
- Australian Capital Territory
- Beecroft Peninsula
- Booderee National Park
- HMS Jervis Bay
- HMAS Jervis Bay (AKR 45)
- Melbourne–Voyager collision
- Jervis Bay National Park
- Jervis Bay Territory
