= Crookhaven Heads Light =

Lighthouse in New South Wales, Australia

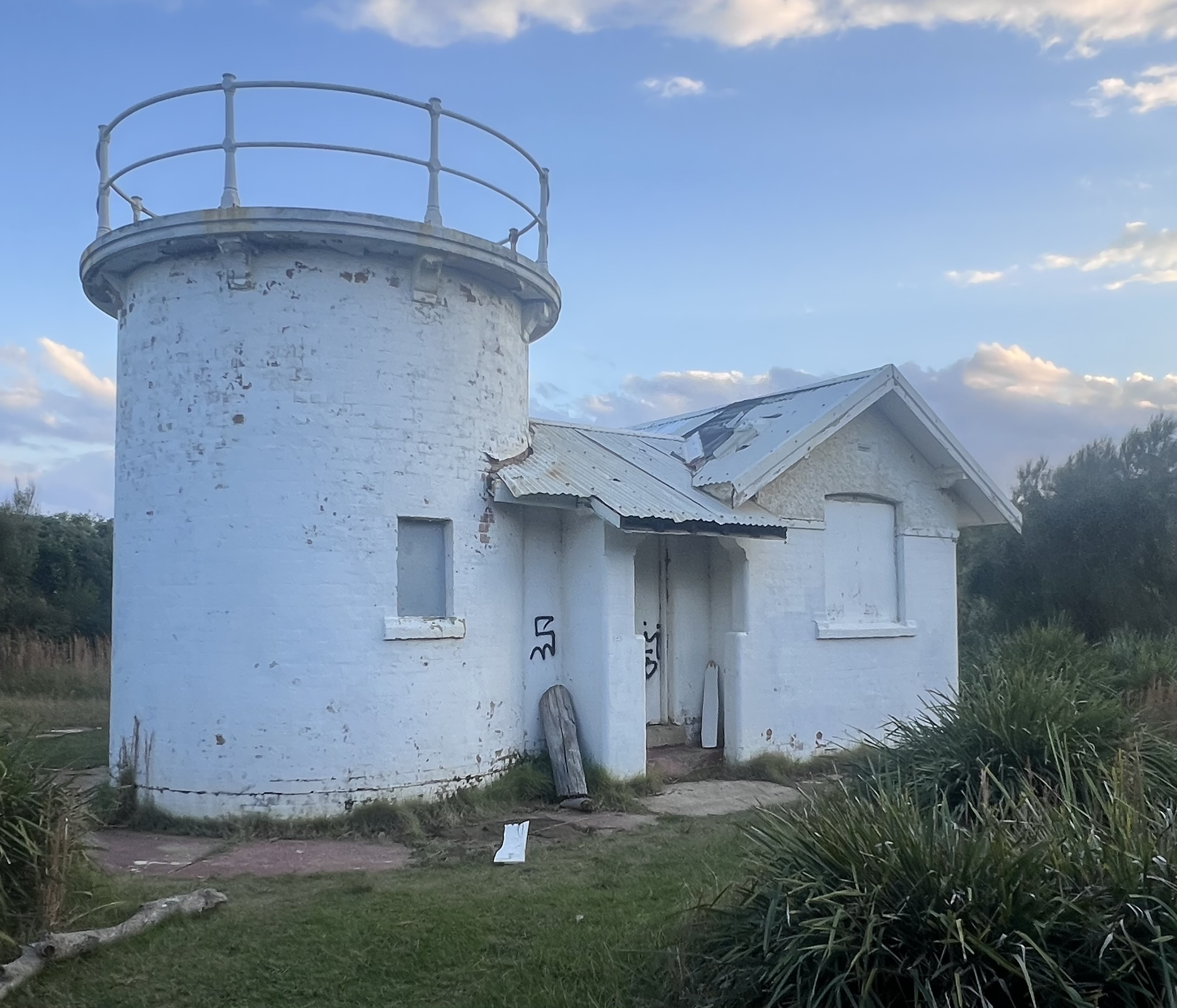
- Crookhaven Heads Light in 2025
- Location: Nowra; New South Wales; Australia
- Coordinates: 34°53′56.84″S 150°46′12.8″E

Tower
- Constructed: 1882 (first)
- Construction: brick tower
- Height: 7 metres (23 ft)
- Shape: cylindrical tower attached to 1-story building and lantern removed in 2011
- Markings: white tower and building
- Power source: solar power
- Operator: NSW Maritime

Light
- First lit: 1904 (current)
- Focal height: 22 metres (72 ft)
- Intensity: 200 cd
- Range: 8 nautical miles (15 km)
- Characteristic: quick-flashing white light

Crookhaven Heads Light is a lighthouse located at Crookhaven Heads, a headland on the south side of the entrance to the Shoalhaven River, north of Culburra Beach, New South Wales, Australia. Together with a movable light flashing yellow every 2 seconds, it served as a range light into the channel. The lighthouse is in a severely deteriorated condition, and considered by some the most endangered lighthouse in New South Wales, suffering from repeated vandalization.

In 2007 it was replaced with a light on a steel pole. In 2022 a replica of the Lighthouse, including the original lantern, was installed at the Jervis Bay Maritime Museum.

== History ==
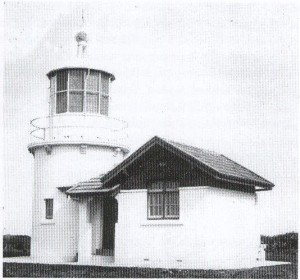
Crookhaven Heads Light c. 1908

The first light on the vicinity was a red lantern made from a ship's masthead supported on two poles, present at the river entrance since 1872.

The station was established with a timber tower in 1882, as part of the Shoalhaven Signal Station 200 metres (660 ft) west of the current lighthouse, with Thomas Bishop as the first operator. The apparatus had been a brass lantern.

The current lighthouse was commissioned in 1904 and the old wooden lighthouse was immediately demolished. The lantern used was the one from the former Cape St George Lighthouse which was replaced by Point Perpendicular Light in 1899. The name of the station was then changed to Crookhaven Heads.

The power source was changed to solar power in the late 20th century.

In 2022 a replica of the Lighthouse, including the original lantern, was installed at the Jervis Bay Maritime Museum.

== State today ==
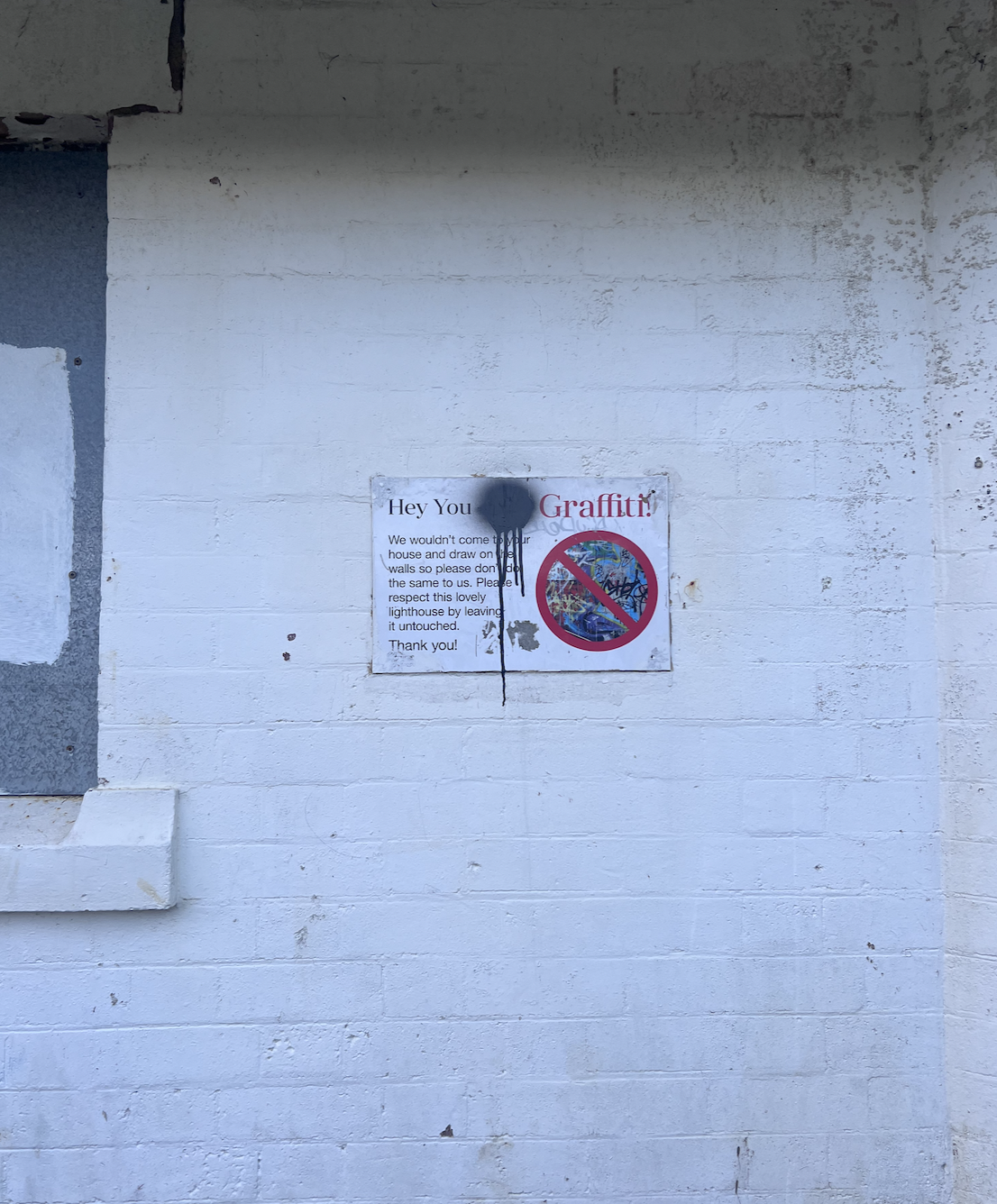
Vandalised anti-graffiti sign on the wall of the Lighthouse

The lighthouse is currently in a severely deteriorated condition due to vandalism. In 2011 the lantern was removed. The doors have been broken and removed, the windows have been smashed and boarded up. Trash has been dumped inside. Vandalism is encouraged by its isolation and aggravated by the fact that the reserve is overgrown, making it impossible to see from the nearby Culburra Beach village.

The lighthouse was restored in the 1990s with wire mesh surrounding the lantern room, but no ongoing plan or presence was set. It was quickly vandalized again, and every piece of glass in the lantern was broken despite the protective mesh.

One step subsequently undertaken was to strip away the thicket so it would be more visible, but without a permanent solution that protects the site, the authorities were reluctant to provide further funds. In 2008 NSW Maritime reported spending $25,600 AUD installing a separate light high atop the tower to protect it from vandalism.

In July 2010, funds of $100,000 AUD were allocated for restoration of the lighthouse by the NSW Minister for Lands Tony Kelly. In 2022 it was partially restored with a replica installed at the Jervis Bay Maritime Museum at a cost of $200,000.

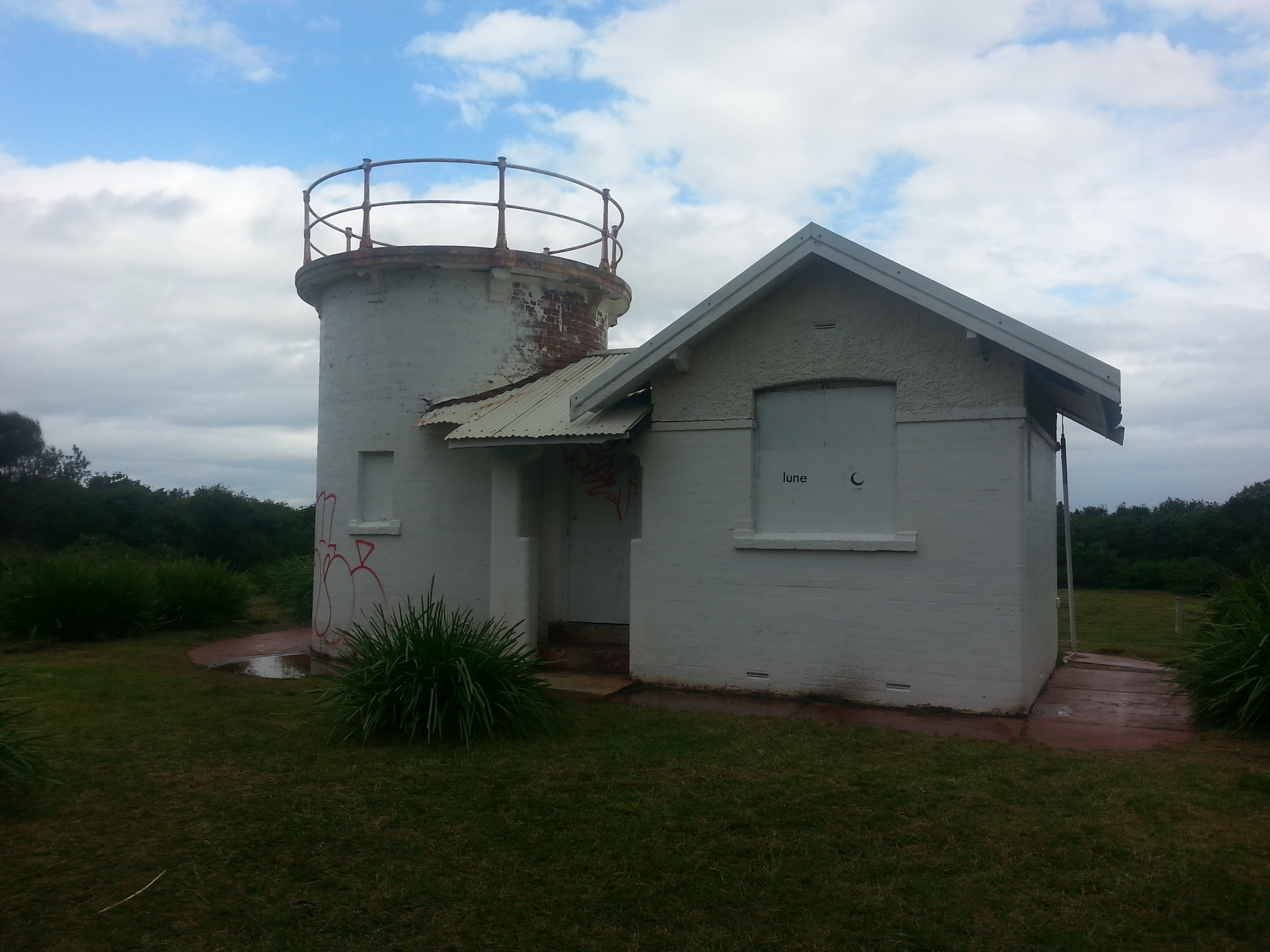
Crookhaven Heads Light in April 2015 – the lantern is completely missing, having been vandalised a number of times

== Structure ==
The tower is made from bricks and attached to a one-story service building. Both are painted white, though the colour is deteriorating.

== Site operation ==
The light is managed by NSW Maritime while the land is owned and managed by the Land and Property Management Authority.

== Visiting ==
The lighthouse is accessible by a short hike through the bush from the parking area at the north end of Prince Edward Avenue in Culburra Beach. There are two tracks up to the lighthouse, one via a short boardwalk and the other to the left (west) via the beach. The grounds are open, but the tower is closed.

== See also ==
- List of lighthouses in Australia
