= Jervis Bay National Park =

National park in Australia

- IUCN category II (national park)
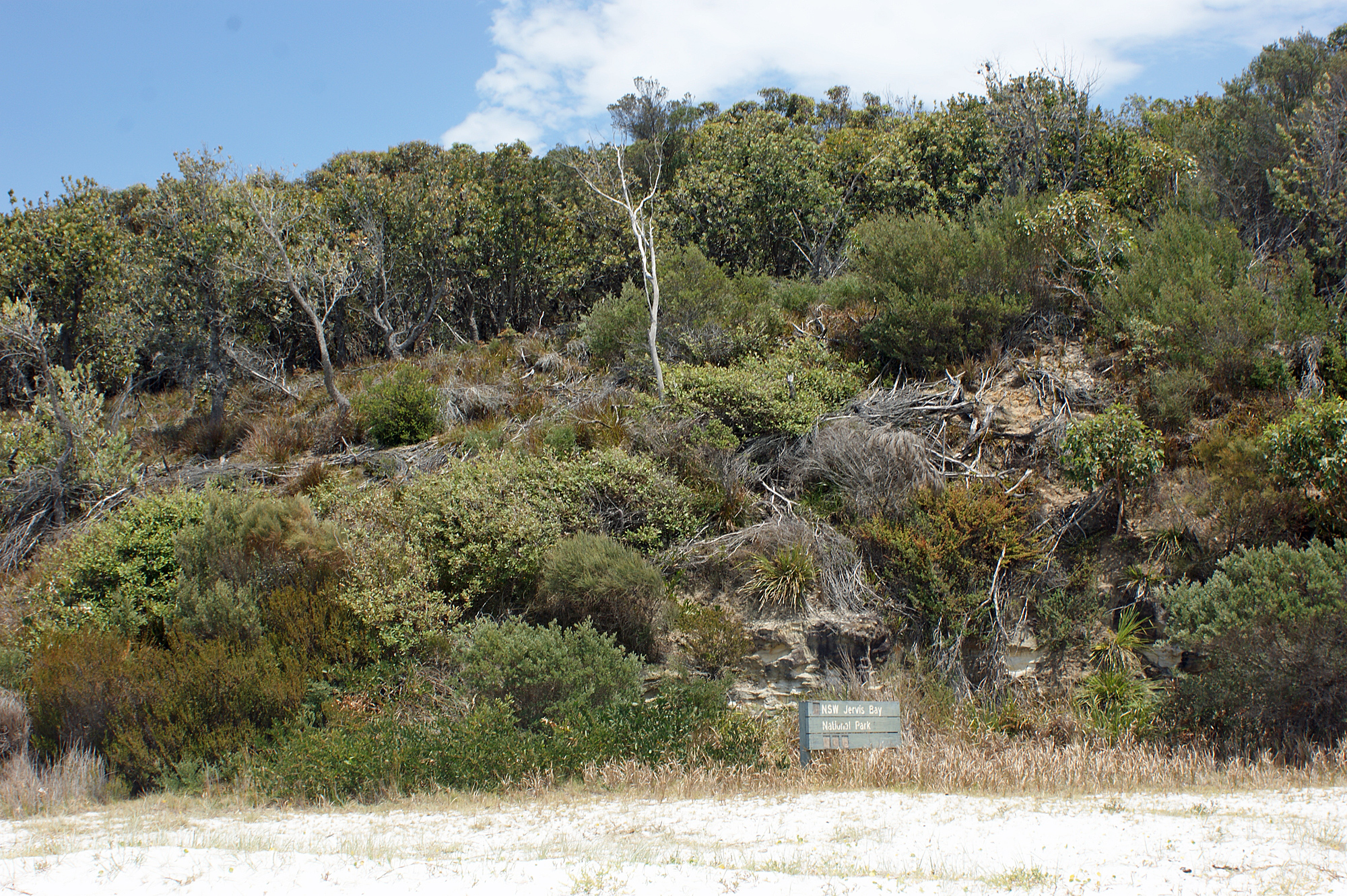

- Location within New South Wales
- Location: New South Wales
- Coordinates: 34°59′14″S 150°45′23″E
- Area: 48.57 km^{2} (18.75 sq mi)
- Established: 15 March 1995
- Governing body: NSW National Parks & Wildlife Service

Jervis Bay National Park, formerly known as Jervis Bay National Park (NSW), consists of several protected areas on the western and northern foreshores of Jervis Bay, on the south coast of New South Wales. The park is close to the town of Huskisson and includes Hyams Beach, renowned for its white sand, whale watching and fishing opportunities.

Visitor facilities are provided in the Greenfield Beach section of the park, including toilets, showers and walking tracks.

== History ==
The park was gazetted in 1995 as "Jervis Bay National Park (NSW)" to avoid confusion with nearby Booderee National Park in the Jervis Bay Territory, then known by the same name. Part of Jervis Bay itself is reserved as Jervis Bay Marine Park.

The Aboriginal heritage in the park dates back thousands of years and they still feel a strong connection to the land.

== Geography ==
Jervis Bay National Park is 48.57 km^{2} in size and is managed by the NSW Department of Planning & Environment.

The average altitude of the terrain is 16 metres.

== Gallery ==
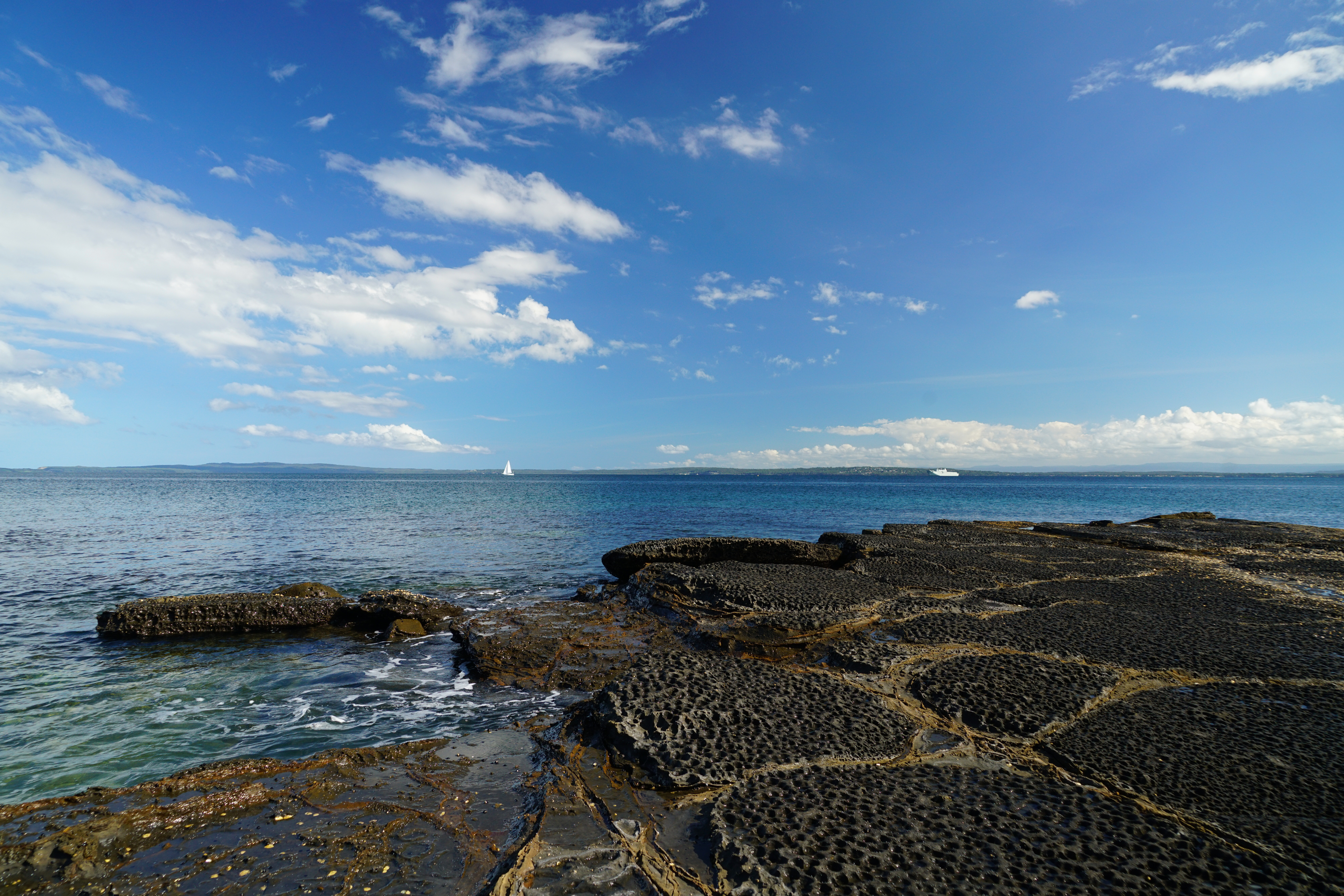
Rock formations

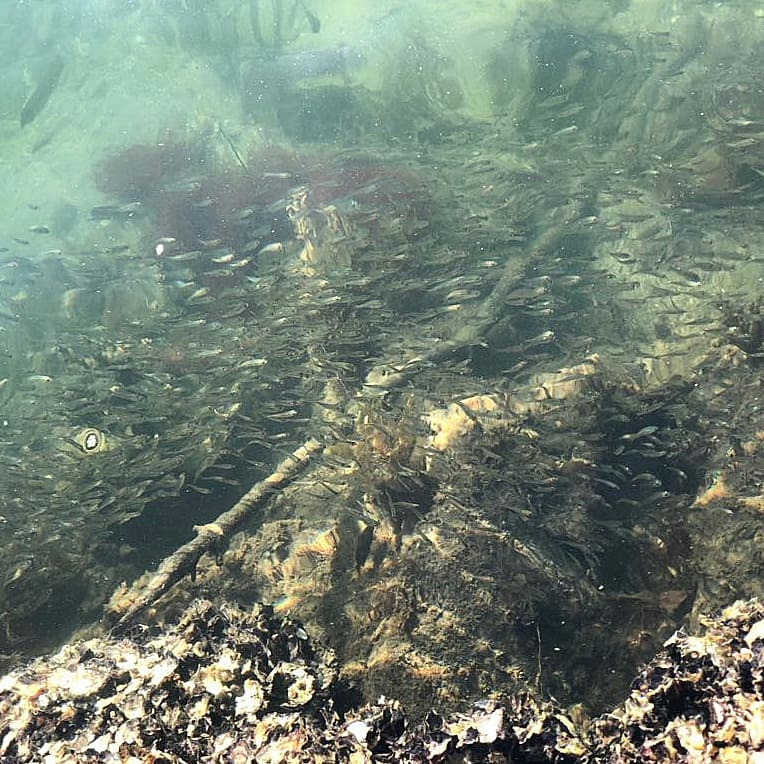
Clear waters

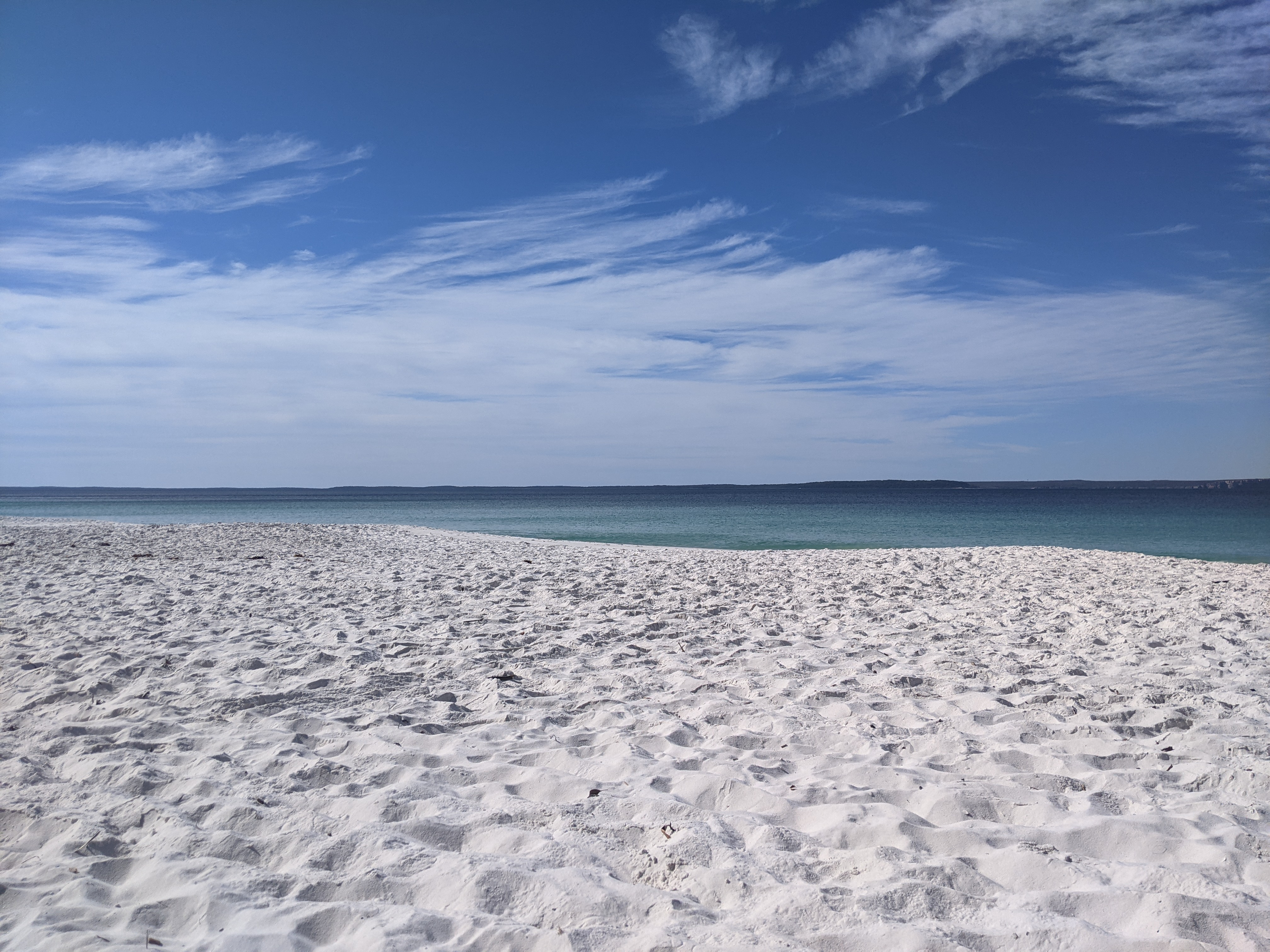
Hyams Beach, Jervis Bay NP

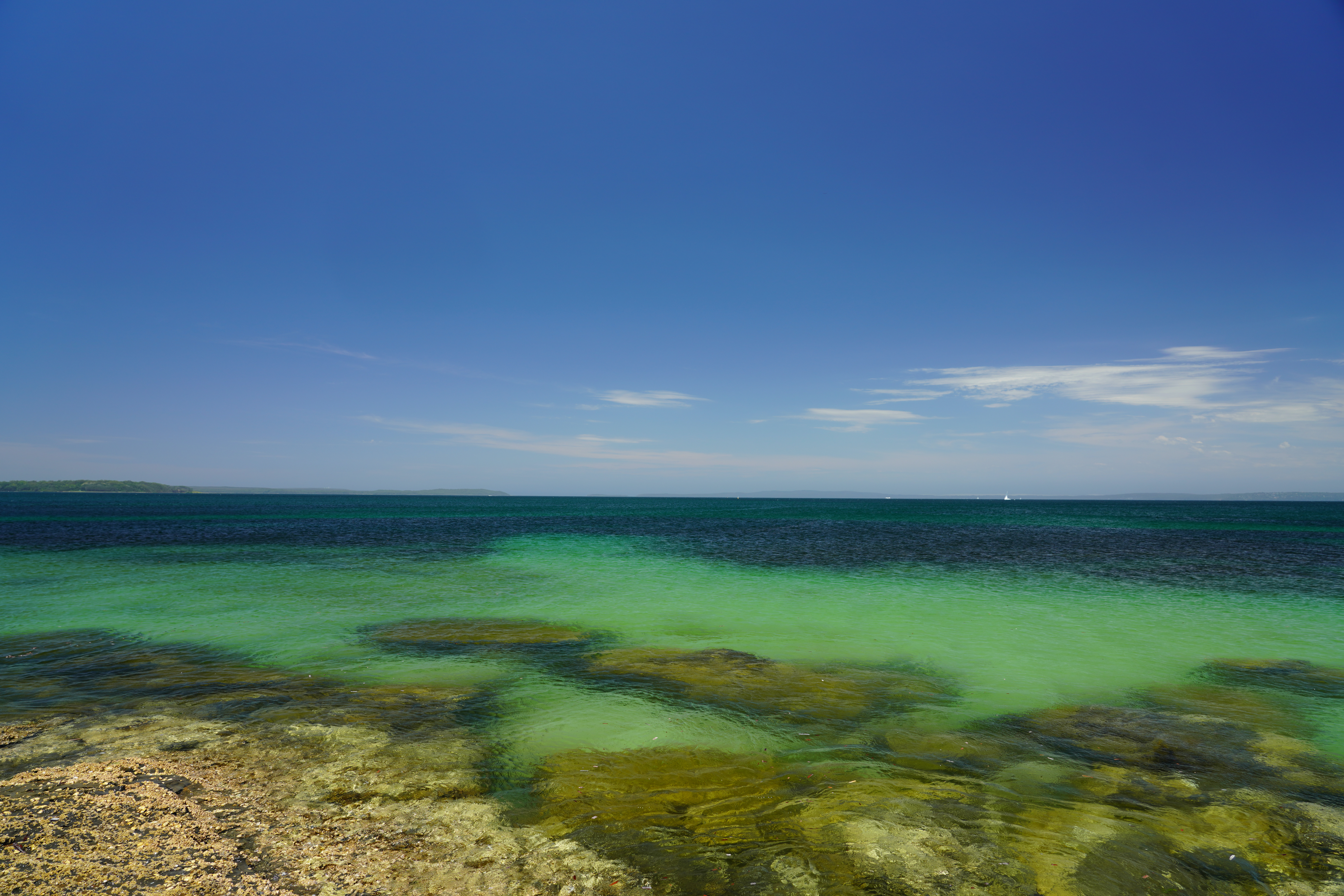
