= Booderee National Park and Botanic Gardens =

National park in Jervis Bay Territory, Australia

Booderee National Park
- IUCN category II (national park)
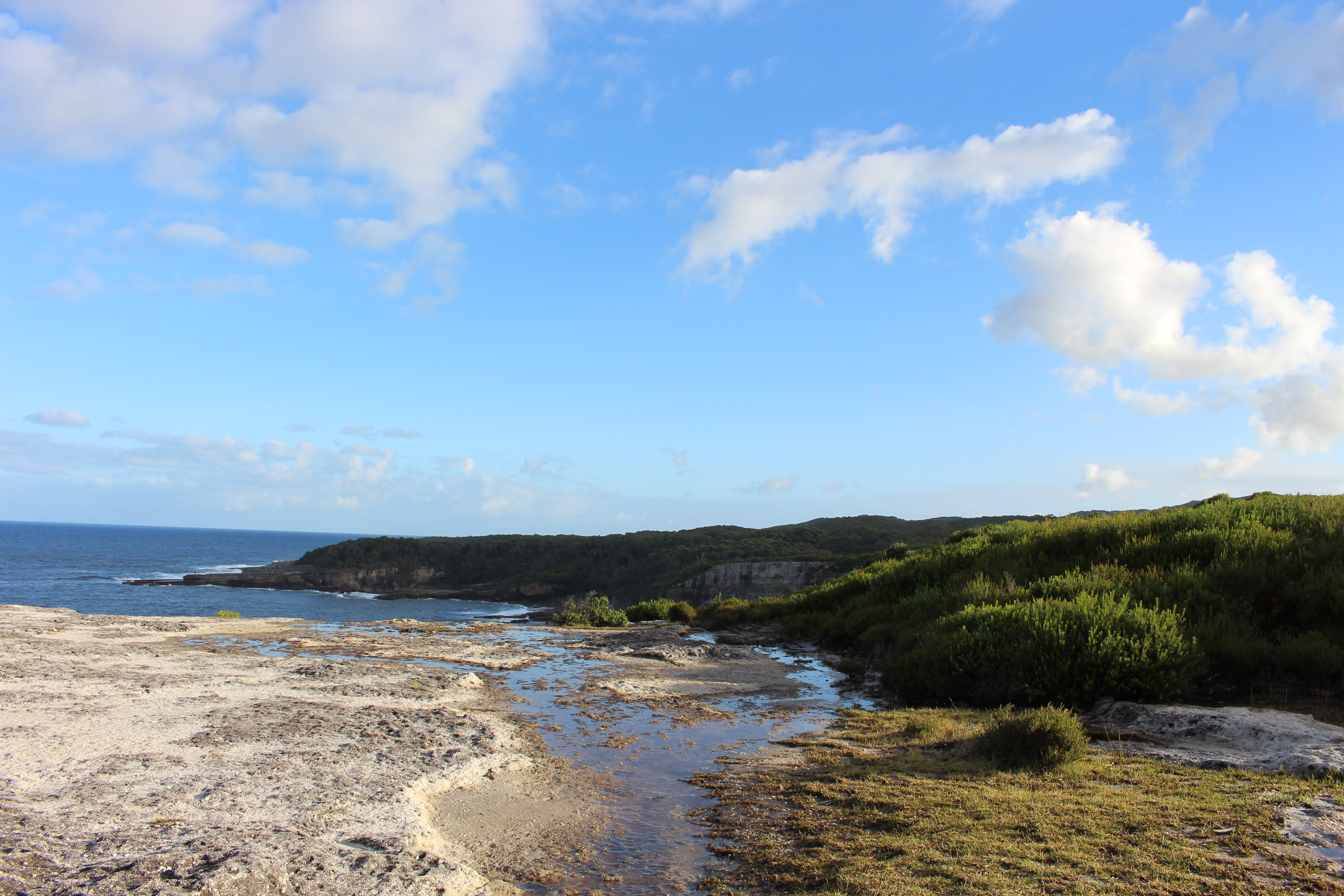

- Location within Jervis Bay Territory Location within Australia
- Location: Jervis Bay Territory
- Nearest city: Sussex Inlet
- Coordinates: 35°09′03″S 150°38′43″E
- Area: 63.12 km^{2} (24.37 sq mi)
- Established: 1992
- Governing body: Director of National Parks; Wreck Bay Aboriginal community
- Website: www.parksaustralia.gov.au/booderee

Booderee National Park and Botanic Gardens, formerly Jervis Bay National Park and Jervis Bay Botanic Gardens, are located in the Jervis Bay Territory of Australia. The reserve is composed of two sections:

- the Bherwerre Peninsula, on the southern foreshore of Jervis Bay, Bowen Island and the waters of the south of the bay
- lands bordered by Wreck Bay to the south, St Georges Basin to the north and Sussex Inlet to the west

What is now a national park was declared as a nature reserve in 1971. In 1992, Jervis Bay National Park was declared. The local Aboriginal community was offered two seats on the park's Board of Management and declined as part of a protest over land rights issues.

In 1995, the park was transferred to the Wreck Bay Aboriginal Community. At this time, the name of the park was changed to "Booderee". The name, meaning "bay of plenty" or "plenty of fish" in the Dhurga language, was chosen by the local Aboriginal community. It is now co-managed with Parks Australia.

== History ==
In 1995, the park was transferred to the Wreck Bay Aboriginal Community, when the name was changed to "Booderee". The name, meaning "bay of plenty" or "plenty of fish" in the Dhurga language, was chosen by the local Aboriginal community. It is now co-managed with Parks Australia. In 2010 the park won international award in the Virgin Holidays' Responsible Tourism Awards.

The lighthouse was built during the 19th century because of the number of the shipwrecks that happened nearby. Unfortunately, the lighthouse was built in the wrong spot and it came to be regarded as a navigational hazard.

== Description ==
The park is managed as an Indigenous Protected Area.

The reserve is composed of two sections:

- The Bherwerre Peninsula, located on the southern foreshore of Jervis Bay;
- The lands bordered by Wreck Bay to the south.

== Park highlights ==
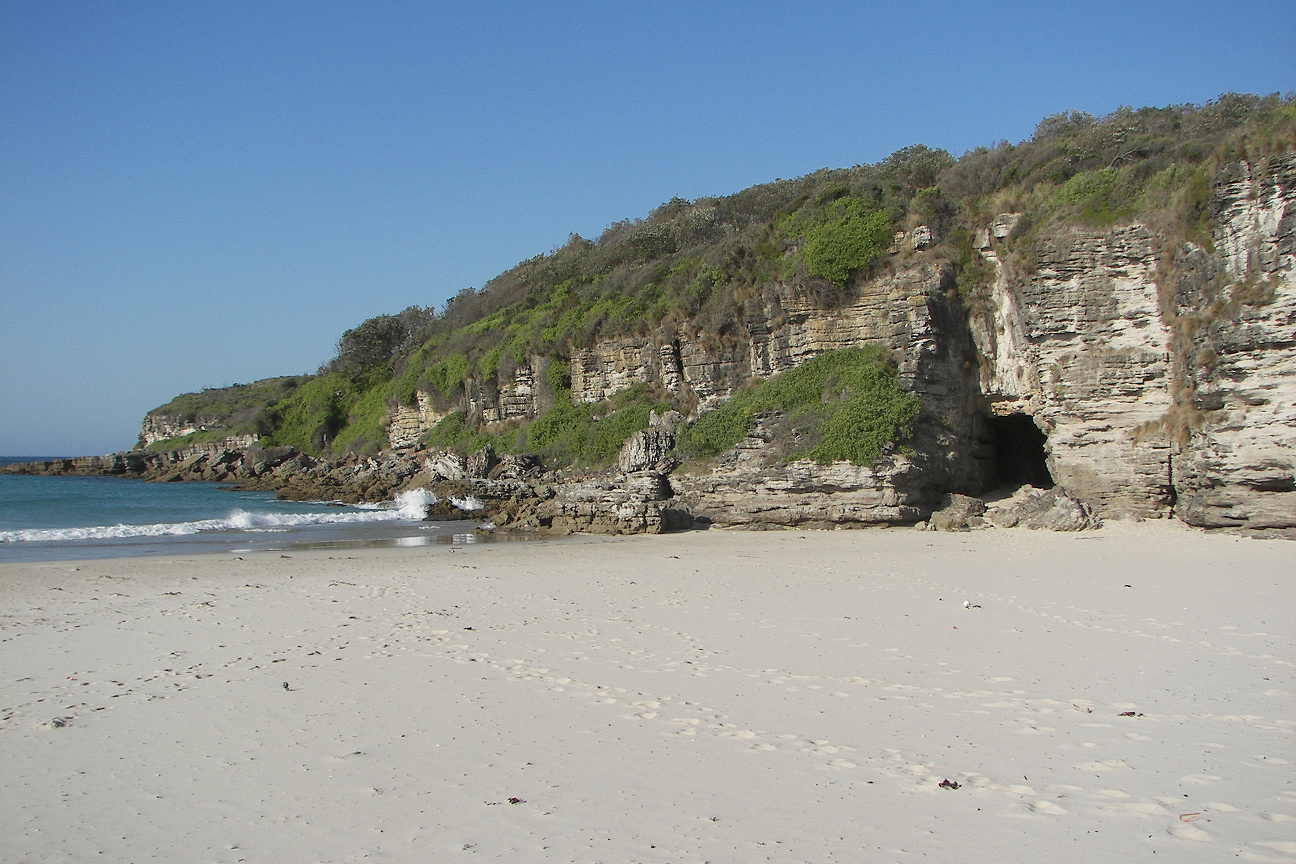
Cave Beach

Cave Beach with its unspoiled beaches and abundant flora and fauna, the park, located just three hours from the cities of Sydney and Canberra, is extremely popular with tourists.

The park's sea cliffs are the highest in New South Wales and among the highest anywhere on the east coast of Australia, peaking at Steamers Head which rises to 130 m.

The Cape St George Lighthouse ruin is considered the most significant European heritage site in the park and was listed on the Register of the National Estate in 1981.

The beach at Greenpatch is a popular destination, and is said to have the whitest sand in the world. In addition there are abundant surf breaks on the ocean sides of the Park, most notably South Coast Pipe.

Although not accessible to the public, a little penguin rookery exists on Bowen Island.

Murray's beach lies just to the west of the southern headland, facing Bowen Island.

== Gallery ==
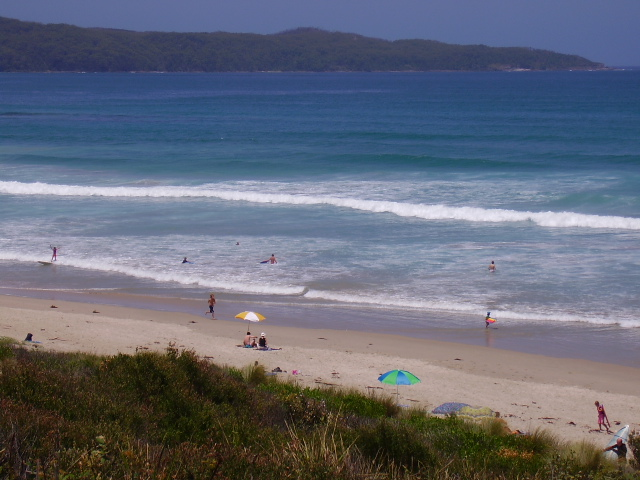
January 2005

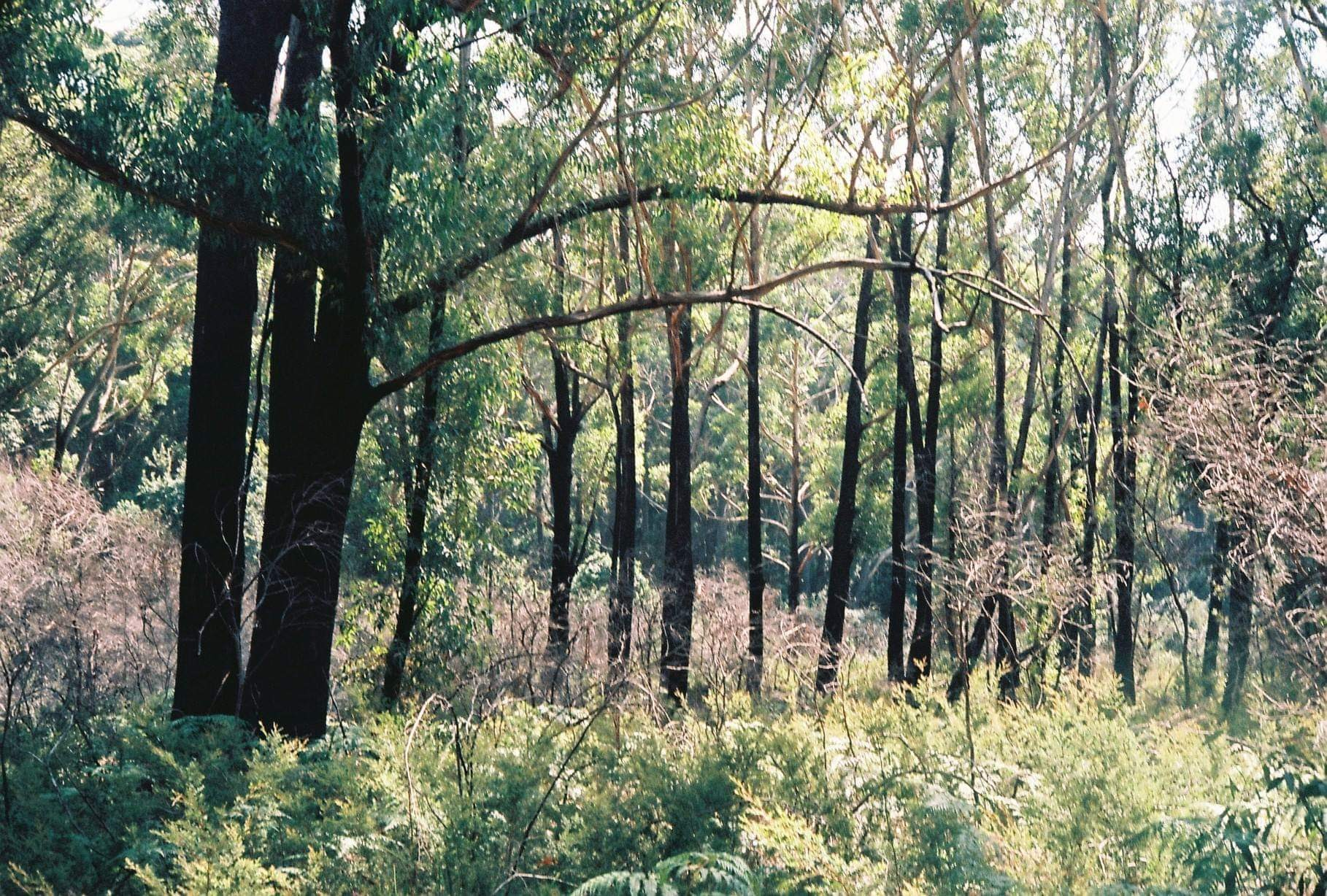
Regrowth after fire, March 2019

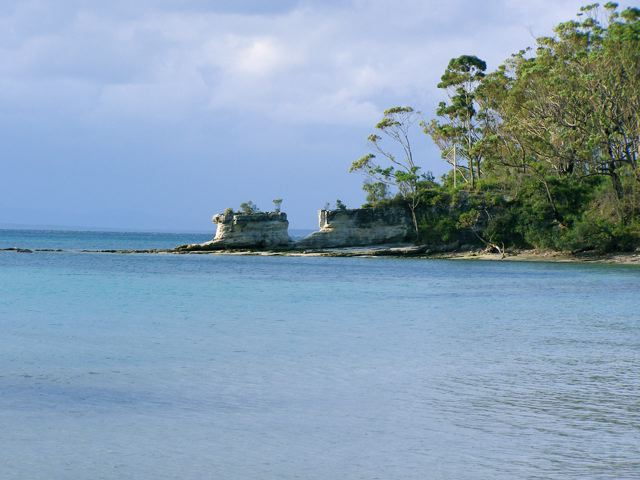
Greenpatch

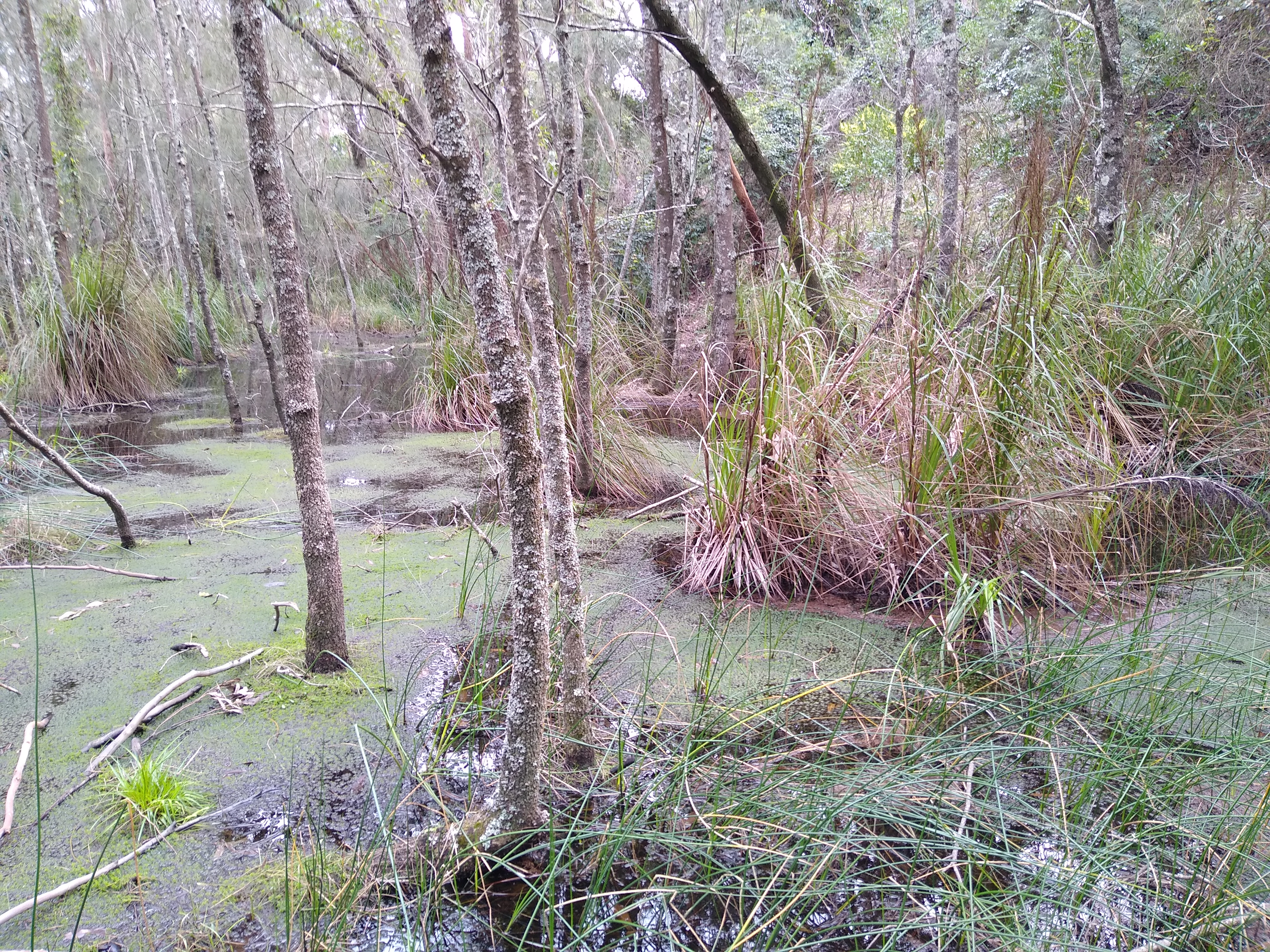
Wetland

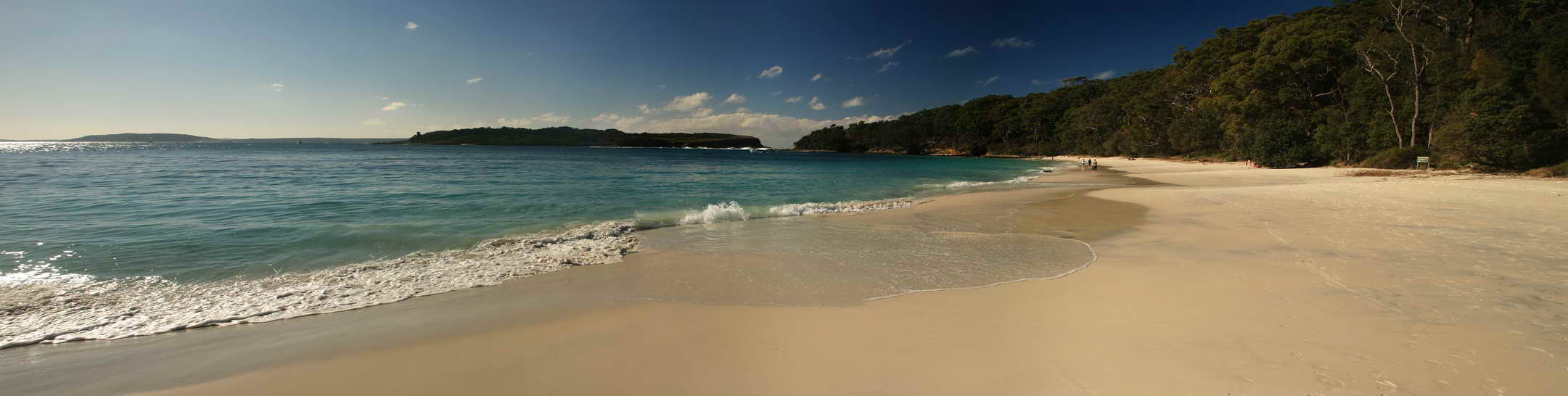
Murrays Beach looking east with Bowen Island at centre

== See also ==
- Indigenous Protected Areas
- Protected areas managed by the Australian government
