= Point Perpendicular Light =

Lighthouse in New South Wales, Australia

Point Perpendicular Light (original)
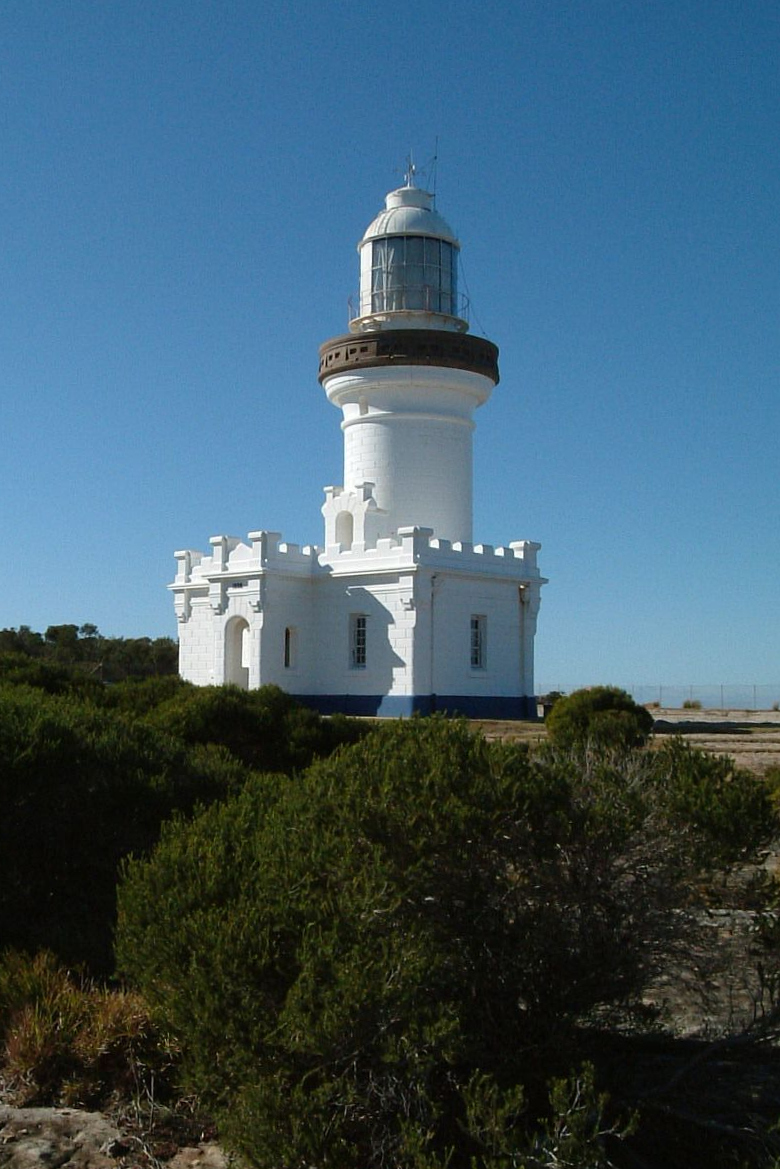
- Point Perpendicular Lighthouse
- Location: Point Perpendicular; New South Wales; Australia
- Coordinates: 35°05′38″S 150°48′16″E

Tower
- Constructed: 1899
- Foundation: solid rock, covered flat concrete base
- Construction: concrete blocks
- Automated: 1993
- Height: 304 feet (93 m)
- Shape: cylindrical tower with balcony and lantern
- Markings: white tower, black gallery rail
- Power source: diesel fuel
- Operator: Australian Maritime Safety Authority
- Heritage: listed on the Commonwealth Heritage List

Light
- Deactivated: 1993
- Focal height: 70 feet (21 m)
- Lens: 1st order Fresnel lens
- Light source: diesel generator
- Intensity: 1,200,000 cd
- Range: 26 nautical miles (48 km)
- Characteristic: Gr (3) W 20s

Point Perpendicular Light is a lighthouse located on Point Perpendicular, a point at the southern tip of the Beecroft Peninsula, in New South Wales, Australia. It marks the northern entrance to Jervis Bay. The historic lighthouse was active from 1889 to 1993 and is still present, though its future is unclear. It is believed to be the first lighthouse in New South Wales which was built of precast concrete blocks. The light was replaced in 1993 with a skeletal tower which is active.

== History ==
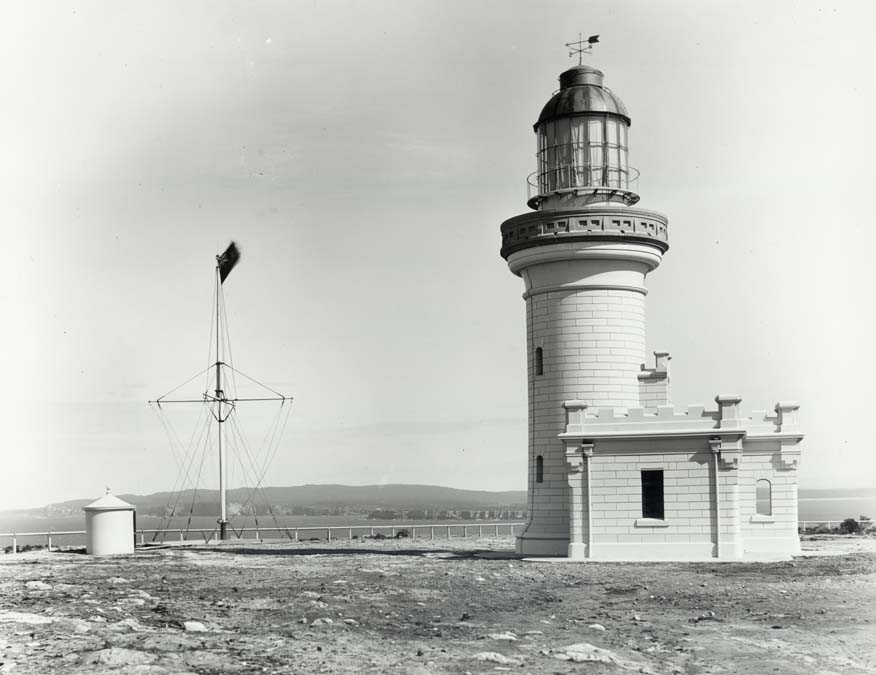
Point Perpendicular lighthouse, 1917

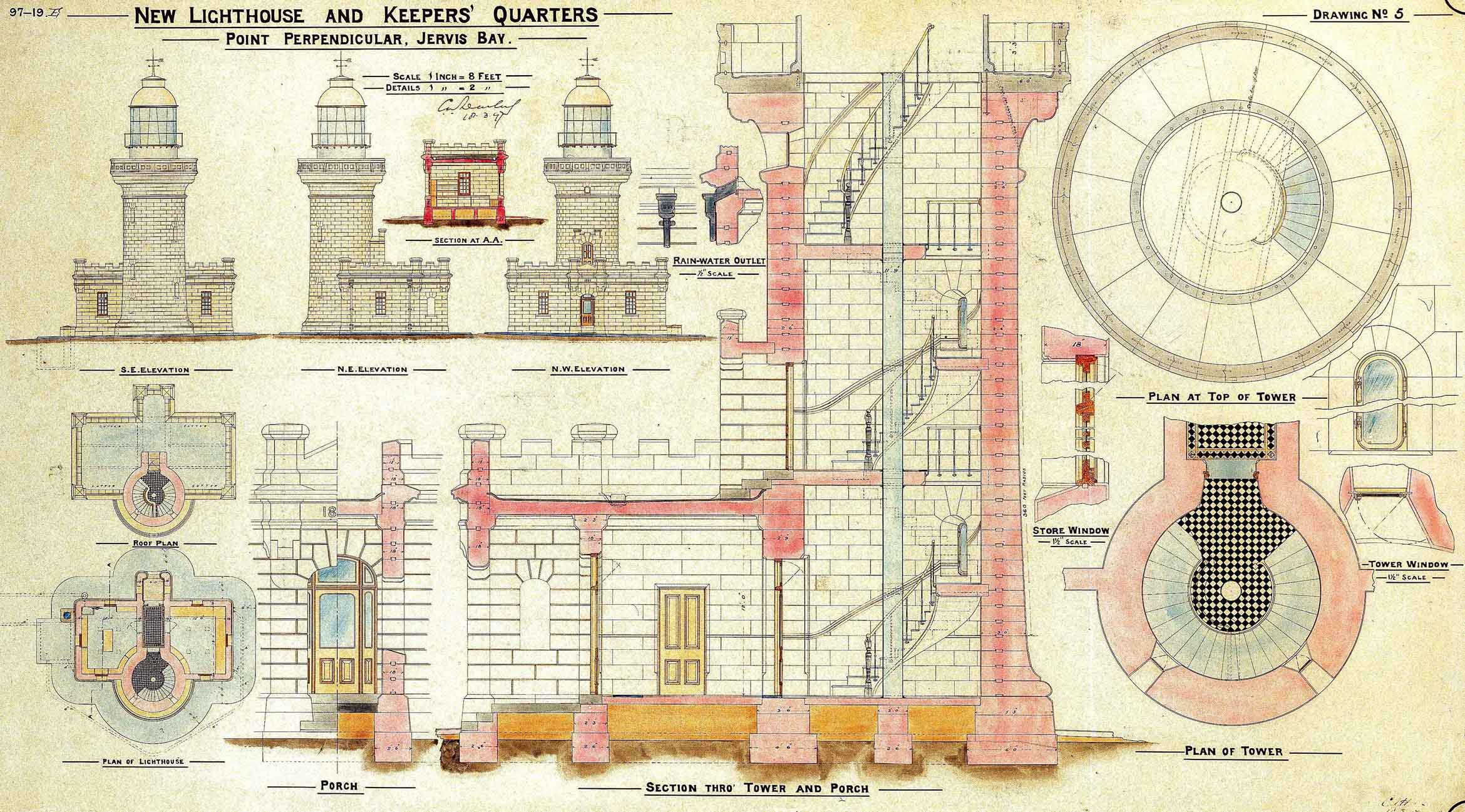
Plans for the lighthouse and keeper's quarters.

Point Perpendicular Lighthouse was built to replace Cape St George Lighthouse which was inadequately located on the southern entrance to Jervis Bay, a fact which was apparent since its construction in 1860. Suggested places for replacing the light were on Bowen Island or Crocodile Head. Point Perpendicular was chosen in September 1883 by Colonial Architect James Barnet and Captain Francis Hixson of the Marine Board.

The plans for the lighthouse were signed on 18 March 1897. The lighthouse was designed by James Barnet's successor, Charles Assinder Harding, who also later designed Cape Byron Light and Norah Head Light, in a style similar to Barnet's.

Tenders were called on 15 April 1897, and by September 1897 construction has started. Most of the materials were landed at Bindijine Wharf, about 8.0 kilometres (5 mi) northwest, which was constructed in 1898. Horse and cart were then used to transport them to the site.

The light was first lit on 1 May 1899. The original light source was a vaporized kerosene lamp with an intensity of 100,000 cd and a visible range of around 33 kilometres (21 mi). The apparatus installed was a massive Chance Bros. 920 millimetres (36 in) three faceted 1st order Fresnel lens, weighing 33 tonnes (32 long tons; 36 short tons), and the original light characteristic was a white flash every 20 seconds (Fl W 20s). The lens is still installed in the lighthouse.

In 1909 the light source was first upgraded, to an intensity of 222,000 cd. It was further upgraded in 1923, to an intensity of 316,000 cd.

In 1964 the light was electrified, 2 diesel engines serving as the power source.

Point Perpendicular Light (active)
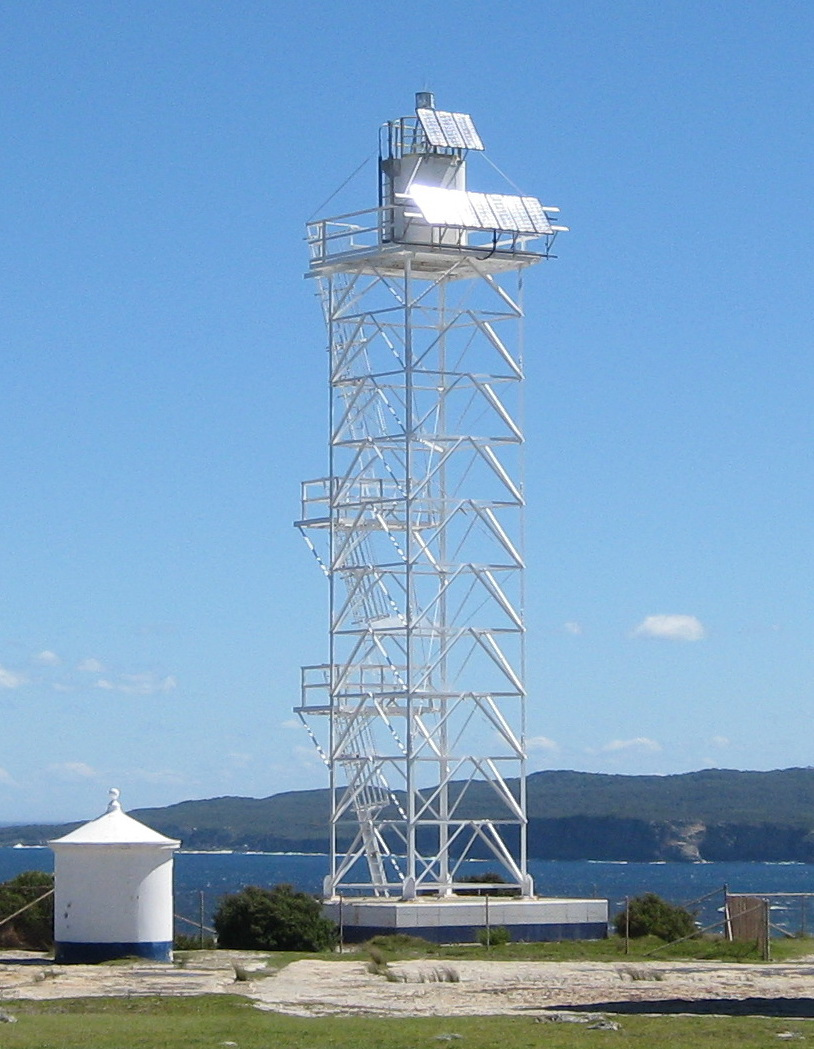
- Skeletal tower that replaced Point Perpendicular Lighthouse
- Location: Point Perpendicular; New South Wales; Australia
- Coordinates: 35°05′39″S 150°48′16″E

Tower
- Constructed: 1993
- Construction: skeletal tower
- Automated: 1993
- Height: 62 feet (19 m)
- Shape: square tower with platform and light
- Markings: white tower
- Power source: diesel fuel
- Operator: Australian Maritime Safety Authority
- Heritage: listed on the Commonwealth Heritage List

Light
- Deactivated: 1993
- Focal height: 311 feet (95 m)
- Intensity: 1,200,000 candela
- Range: 19 nautical miles (35 km)
- Characteristic: Fl W 10s.

On 5 July 1993 the light was shut down and replaced with a fully automated, solar powered lamp on top of a lattice skeletal tower. At that time the light was a 120 V, 1000 W quartz halogen lamp, visible to a range of 26 nautical miles (48 km; 30 mi) and the light characteristic was a group of three white flashes every twenty seconds (Gr(3) W 20s).

The future of the lighthouse is unclear. Though it was agreed upon that access to the historic lighthouse would continue, the Department of Defence, the agency governing the site, originally fenced it and access was limited. It is unclear what the exact restrictions are at this point. The structures on the location were put on sale, and the outcome of this is also unclear.

=== Light keepers ===
The first keepers were William Parker as head keeper, with William Simpson and Arthur Bailey as assistant keepers. William Parker was previously the light keeper of Cape St George Lighthouse, and Arthur Bailey was the son of Edward Bailey, the late keeper of Cape St George Lighthouse.

The last keeper was John Hampson.

=== Re-lightings ===
The light was relit twice to celebrate important occasions.

The first occasion was the lighthouse centenary, which was on 1 May 1999, though celebrations were postponed until October 1999 to be incorporated in the Currarong Seafare Festival. Celebrations included a ball and an art and photography competition on 15 October 1999. This was followed by on-site celebrations on 16 October, including tours, a naval display, a market day, children's activities and finally, the lighthouse was lit. The light remained lit between 6pm (which was the time of dusk, the light was set to switch itself automatically) and 11pm. The new light was shut down for the period.

The light was re-lit once more on 20–21 August 2005 for the International Lighthouse & Lightship Weekend 2005.

== Structures ==
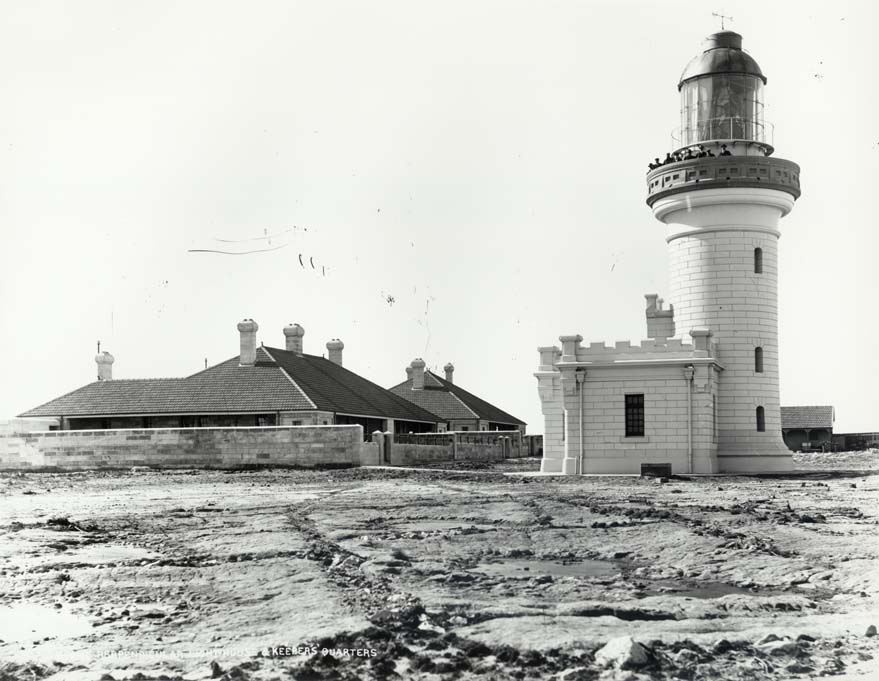
A view of the lighthouse and the keeper's residence, close to their construction

The tower is made from concrete blocks which were made on the ground, lifted into position, and then cement-rendered inside and outside, a technique which eases building as it does not require formworks or scaffolding. The block varied in size and shape, but were mostly 12 inches (300 mm) high.

The tower is circular, with an internal diameter of 11 feet 9 inches (3.58 m). It is 44 feet (13 m) to the balcony, divided into three stories by concrete floors paved with black and white tiles, staircases 3 feet (0.91 m) wide leading from one floor to the next, with a handrail of 2 inches (51 mm) heavy brass tubing. On top of the tower is a bluestone gallery and balcony with black railings.

The tower is painted white with a blue trim on the bottom.

Above the main door there is a glass window displaying a Waratah, the state flower of New South Wales, and the construction date.

The tower is attached to a one-storey lighthouse keeper's house made from the same concrete blocks, painted likewise white with a blue trim on the bottom.

The keepers' residences are located about 70 feet (21 m) south of the lighthouse. Originally each had an underground water tank of 6,500 imperial gallons (30,000 L; 7,800 US gal), kept filled by rain from the roofs.

Also present is a structure originally serving as a two-stall stable and coach house, which was later used to house the generators.

== Site operation and visiting ==
The light is operated by Australian Maritime Safety Authority. The site is operated by the Department of Defence, and used for gunnery practice about 100 days a year, in which access is limited.

== See also ==
- List of lighthouses in Australia
