= Bowen Island (Jervis Bay) =

Island in Jervis Bay Territory, Australia

Coordinates: 35°07′06″S 150°46′07″E

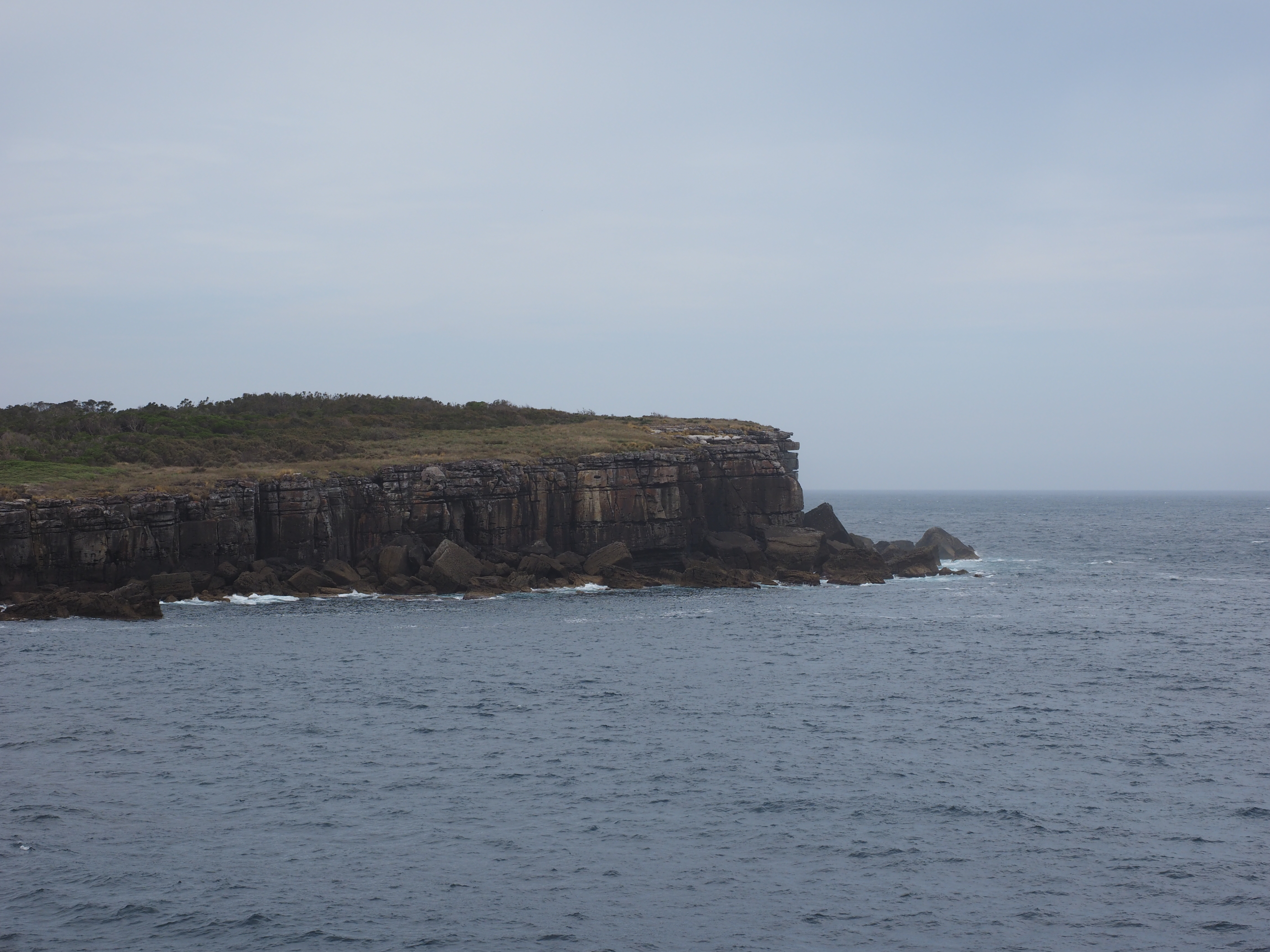
Cliffs on the southern coast of Bowen Island

Bowen Island is a sandstone island lying 250 metres (270 yd) off the tip of the Bherwerre Peninsula at the entrance to Jervis Bay, on the coast of New South Wales, Australia. The island, however, is not part of the state of New South Wales but of the Jervis Bay Territory, administered by Australia's federal government. It lies within the Booderee National Park.

== Description ==
The island is tear-shaped, about 1.1 kilometres (1,200 yd) long north to south, and 600 metres (660 yd) wide. It slopes sharply from the cliffs on its eastern, or oceanic, side down to rock platforms at sea level on its west. Much of it is covered by windblown sand supporting, and stabilised by, various vegetation communities. The island was named after Lieutenant Richard Bowen RN. Another Bowen Island, in Canada, is named after Richard's eldest brother Rear-Admiral James Bowen RN.

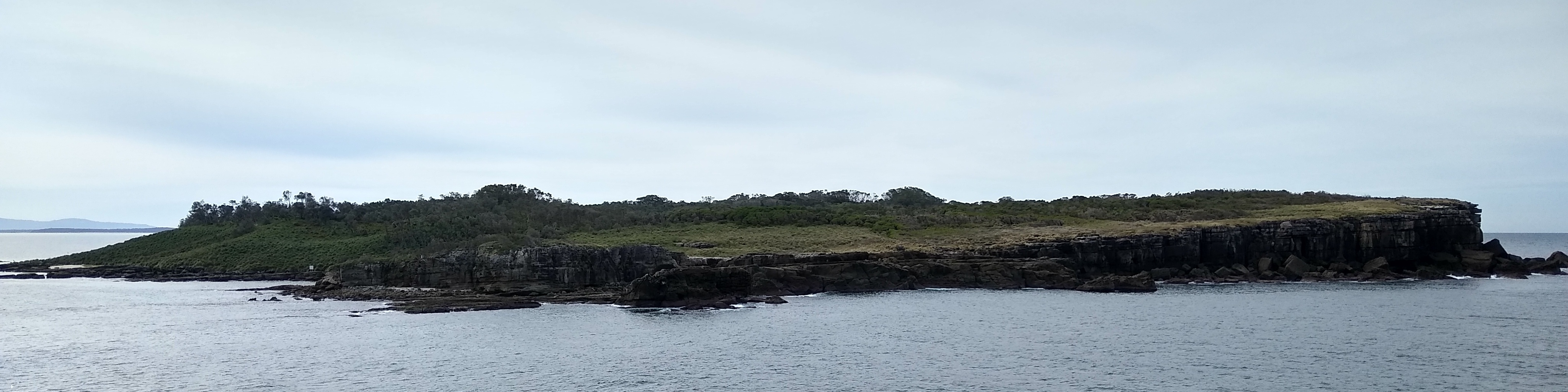
Bowen Island seen from Governor Head, Jervis Bay Territory

== Birds ==
The island, with the waters on its western side, constitutes a special purpose zone intended to protect nesting seabirds and their habitat from disturbance, and is not open to general public access. Birds nesting on the island include sooty oystercatchers and three species of shearwater (little, wedge-tailed and short-tailed).

=== Australian little penguin colony ===
Bowen Island is home to an important Australian little penguin colony, with some 5000 breeding pairs. The population has increased from 1000 breeding pairs in 1979, to 1500 breeding pairs in 1985 and 2500 breeding pairs in 1993. In 2012, just over 50 individuals were marked as part of a little penguin research project. DNA samples were also collected and some birds were micro-chipped. The Bowen Island colony was revisited several times in 2013 with results to be published in a forthcoming PhD thesis.

A description of the island from 1948 warned 'one is apt to trip over penguins if he wanders around at night.' Penguins were known to inhabit the island since at least 1908, when they were described as being present in large numbers.

== Coastal defence battery ==
A coastal defence battery named Bowen Battery was established on the island during World War II to protect ships anchored in Jervis Bay. A single QF 4.7-inch Mk 1 was emplaced, and a jetty, several buildings, a concrete command and observation post and an underground ammunition magazine were constructed. The gun was elderly and in poor condition after being extensively used in previous roles. It proved to be very inaccurate on the only occasion it was test fired. The battery was probably closed in 1943 as part of a general reduction in coastal defence units in Australia.
