= Greenpatch Point =

Coordinates: 35°08′11.49″S 150°43′28.90″E

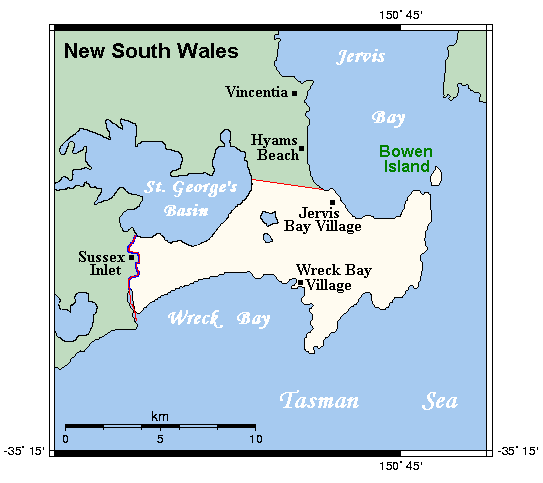
Jervis Bay Territory map

Greenpatch is a locality in the Jervis Bay Territory, Australia. It is located inside Boodere National Park.

== Amenities ==
Usually, the amenities there include:

- Fresh water
- Toilets
- Hot water showers
- Sheltered BBQ areas

== Geography ==
Greenpatch is located on Aboriginal Land within Booderee National Park. It is located near HMAS Creswell and Jervis Bay Village. Greenpatch beach is approximately 1.5 kilometres (0.93 mi) long.

Boarded Walkway leading out into Greenpatch Beach

== Wildlife ==
Greenpatch is home to many different kinds of Australian native flora and fauna, including kangaroos, kookaburras, rosellas, lorikeets, wombats and many more.

== See also ==
- Jervis Bay Territory
- Jervis Bay Village
- Wreck Bay Village
