= Point Perpendicular =

Coordinates: 35°05′38″S 150°48′19″E

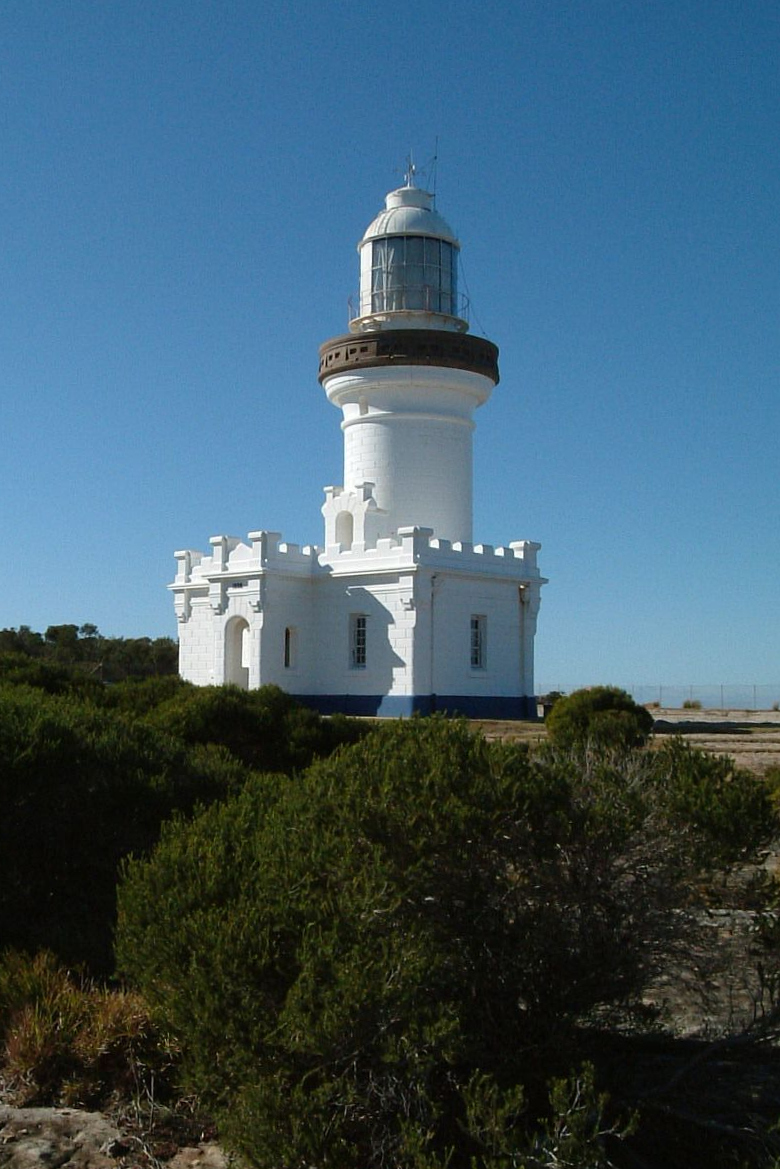
Point Perpendicular Lighthouse

Point Perpendicular is a point at the southern tip of the Beecroft Peninsula and at the northern entry to Jervis Bay, in New South Wales, Australia. It is the location of Point Perpendicular Light, a historic lighthouse which was active from 1889 to 1993, and a replacement skeletal tower which is active.

The lighthouse and its grounds are an exclave of the state of New South Wales.
