= Jervis Bay Marine Park =

Protected area in New South Wales, Australia

- IUCN category VI (protected area with sustainable use of natural resources)
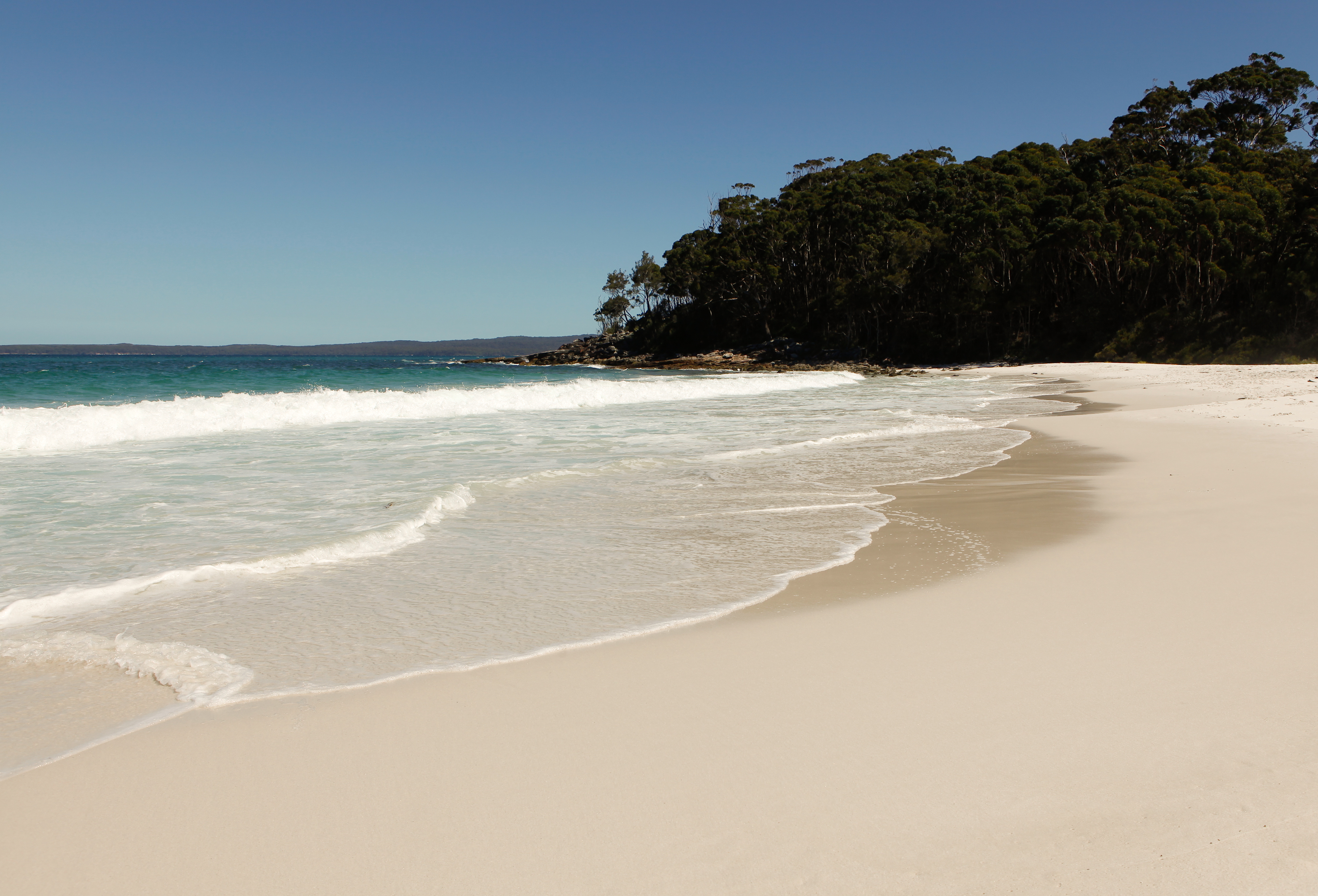
- Beach at Jervis Bay

- Location within New South Wales
- Location: New South Wales
- Nearest city: Vincentia
- Coordinates: 35.065°S 150.733°E
- Area: 210 km^{2} (81 sq mi)
- Established: 1998
- Governing body: New South Wales Marine Parks Authority
- Website: Official website

Jervis Bay Marine Park is a marine protected area established by the Government of New South Wales in 1998. and the current zoning plan has been in place since 1 October 2002. The marine park is approximately 210 km^{2} (81 mi^{2}) in area and spans over 100 km (62 mi) of coastline from Kinghorn Point in the north to Sussex Inlet. The marine park is zoned to conserve biological diversity in marine habitats and to provide a range of recreational and commercial activities.

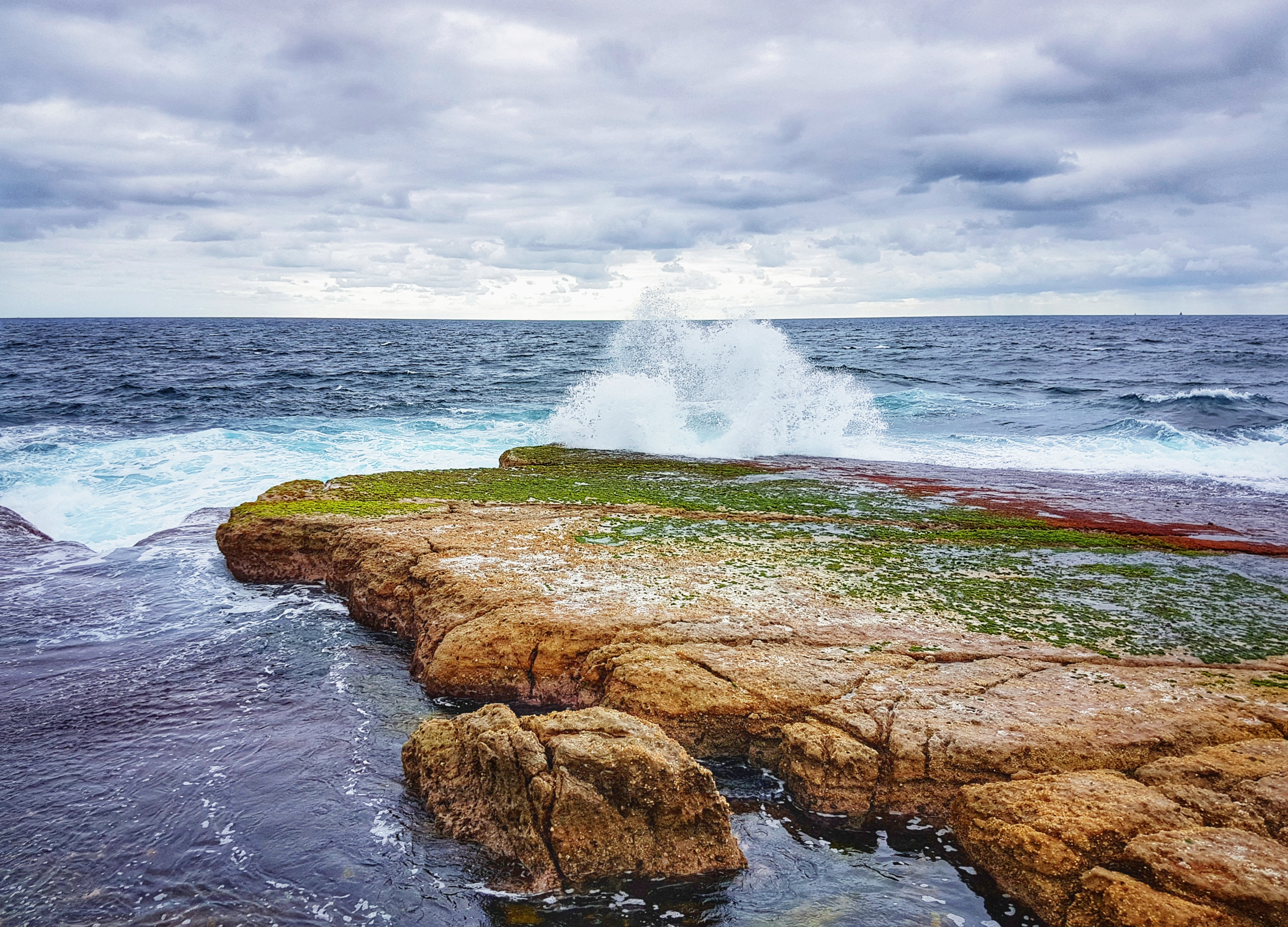
Waves crashing over Moes Rock at Jervis Bay Marine Park

== Location ==
Maps and descriptions of the current zoning of the Jervis Bay Marine Park can be found in the following references.

== Establishment ==
The Australian Government ratified the United Nations Convention on Biological Diversity on 29 December 1993. The Convention requires member states to meet the following requirements:

- Development of strategies, plans or programs for the conservation and sustainable use of biological diversity (Article 6);
- Monitoring and identification activities to ensure sustainable use of biological diversity (Article 7);
- Development of protected areas to conserve biological diversity (Article 8);
- Development of guidelines and regulations to protect the ecosystems and natural habitats in the conservation areas (Article 8);
- Requirement for sustainable development in areas adjacent to protected areas (Article 8).

For Australia to meet the requirements of the treaty, conservation strategies need to be integrated into the development process, including land-use planning, marine and coastal zone planning, forest management plans, and environmental impact assessment.

To address the requirements of the treaty, the Government of New South Wales established marine parks with zoning that allows or prohibits particular activities to conserve the diversity of marine life and ensure that marine resources are carefully managed for use and enjoyment now and in the future.

== Review of zoning ==
On 25 May 2011, Government of New South Wales proposed to undertake a scientific audit of the effectiveness of the current marine park zones. On 26 May 2011, the new zoning plan implemented by the former government on 1 March 2011 was abolished and the original zoning plan in place since 2002 was restored because of "concerns about the consultation process" and pending the outcomes of the audit. The audit aims to review the effectiveness of the zones and the current measures in place to prevent threats to the marine environment such as pollution, coastal development and the introduction of diseases and pest species.

== See also ==
- NSW Protected Areas
