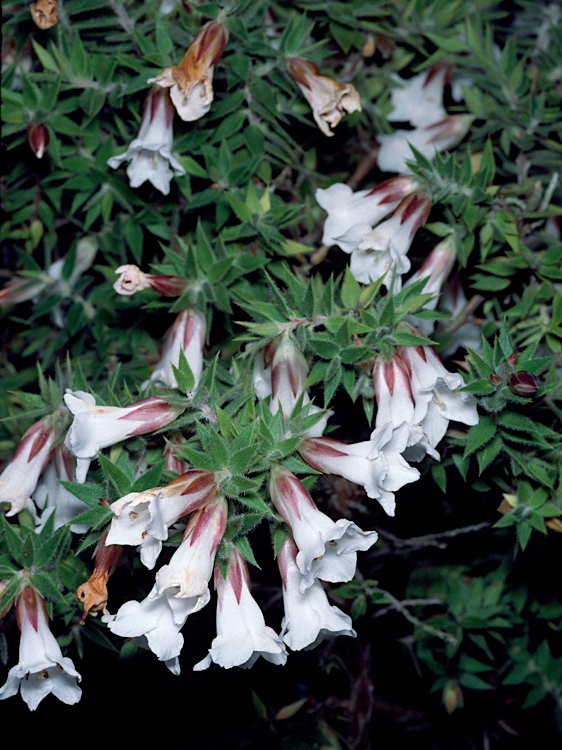
- In the Australian National Botanic Gardens

Conservation status
- Endangered (EPBC Act)

Scientific classification
- Kingdom: Plantae
- Clade: Tracheophytes
- Clade: Angiosperms
- Clade: Eudicots
- Clade: Asterids
- Order: Ericales
- Family: Ericaceae
- Genus: Epacris
- Species: E. hamiltonii

Binomial name
- Epacris hamiltonii Maiden & Betche

= Epacris hamiltonii =

Species of flowering plant

Epacris hamiltonii is a species of flowering plant in the family Ericaceae and is endemic to the Blue Mountains in New South Wales. It is a slender, low-lying to ascending shrub with hairy branchlets, thin, flat, hairy egg-shaped leaves, and white, tube-shaped flowers arranged in small groups at the end of branches.

== Description ==
Epacris hamiltonii is a slender, low-lying to ascending shrub with branches up to 100 cm (39 in) high, the branchlets covered with shaggy hairs. The leaves are egg-shaped, 6.7–14 mm (0.26–0.55 in) long and 2.8–6.2 mm (0.11–0.24 in) wide on a petiole 0.8–1.3 mm (0.031–0.051 in) long. The leaves are thin and flat, both sides covered with long, silky hairs. The flowers are arranged in small groups at the ends of branches and are about 7.5–10 mm (0.30–0.39 in) in diameter on a peduncle about 1 mm (0.039 in) long. The sepals are 7.2–10 mm (0.28–0.39 in) long, the petal tube 7.8–12 mm (0.31–0.47 in) long with spreading lobes 3.6–5.8 mm (0.14–0.23 in) long. The anthers are enclosed in the petal tube but the style is longer than it. Flowering occurs from September to December and the fruit is a capsule about 2 mm (0.079 in) long, containing dust-like seeds.

== Taxonomy ==
Epacris hamiltonii was first formally described in 1900 by Joseph Maiden and Ernst Betche in the Proceedings of the Linnean Society of New South Wales, from specimens collected in 1900 near Blackheath in the Blue Mountains by Arthur Andrew Hamilton.

== Distribution and habitat ==
This epacris only grows in moist soil on or near cliffs of Narrabeen sandstone near perennial creeks that flow into the Grose Valley in the Blue Mountains of New South Wales.

== Conservation status ==
Epacris hamiltonii is listed as "endangered" under the Australian Government Environment Protection and Biodiversity Conservation Act 1999 and the New South Wales Government Biodiversity Conservation Act 2016. The main threats to the species include inappropriate fire regimes, trampling by walkers, weed invasion, and changes in water flow and quality.
