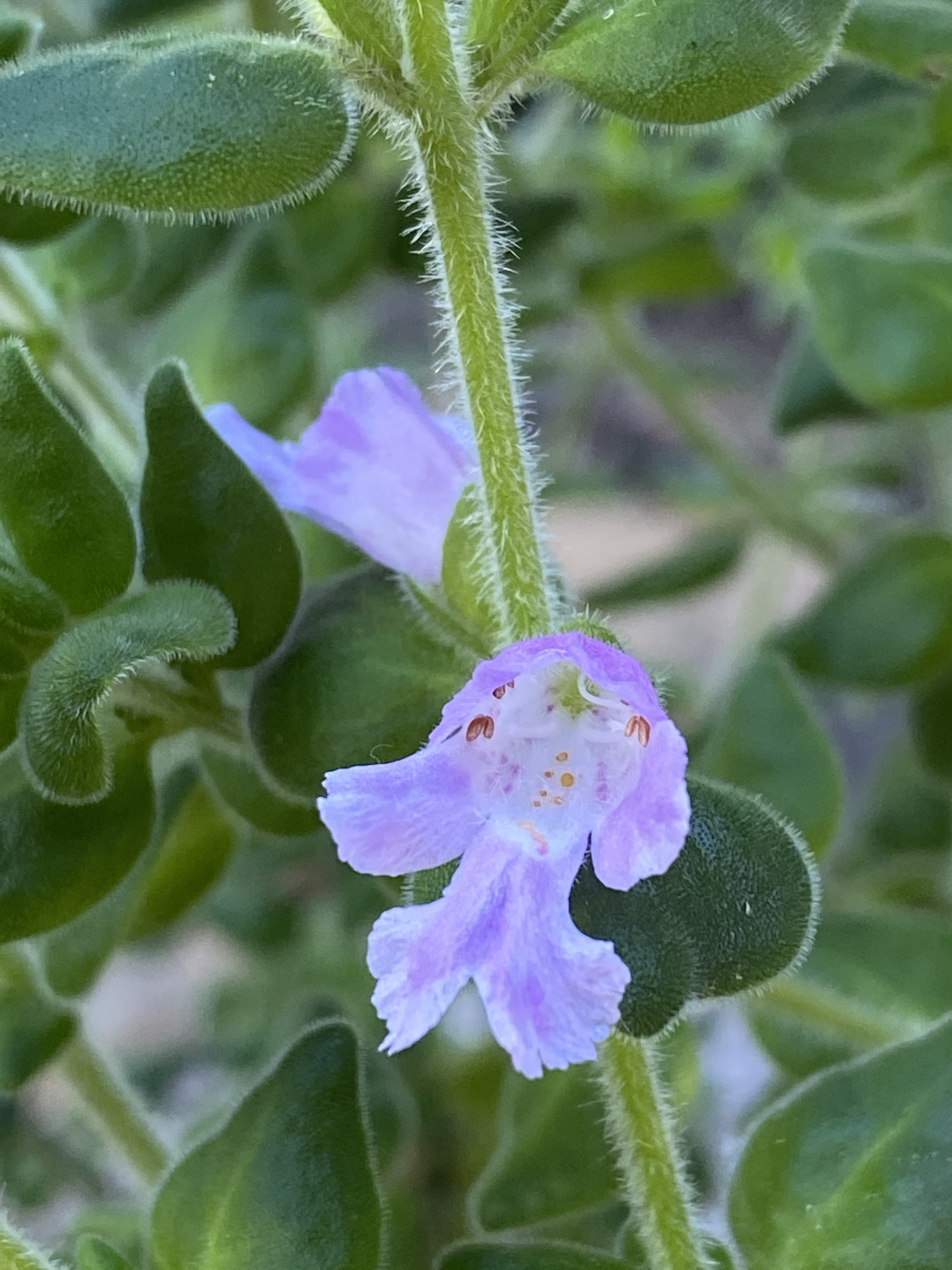
- In Mount Annan Botanic Garden

Conservation status
- Vulnerable (EPBC Act)

Scientific classification
- Kingdom: Plantae
- Clade: Tracheophytes
- Clade: Angiosperms
- Clade: Eudicots
- Clade: Asterids
- Order: Lamiales
- Family: Lamiaceae
- Genus: Prostanthera
- Species: P. densa

Binomial name
- Prostanthera densa A.A.Ham.
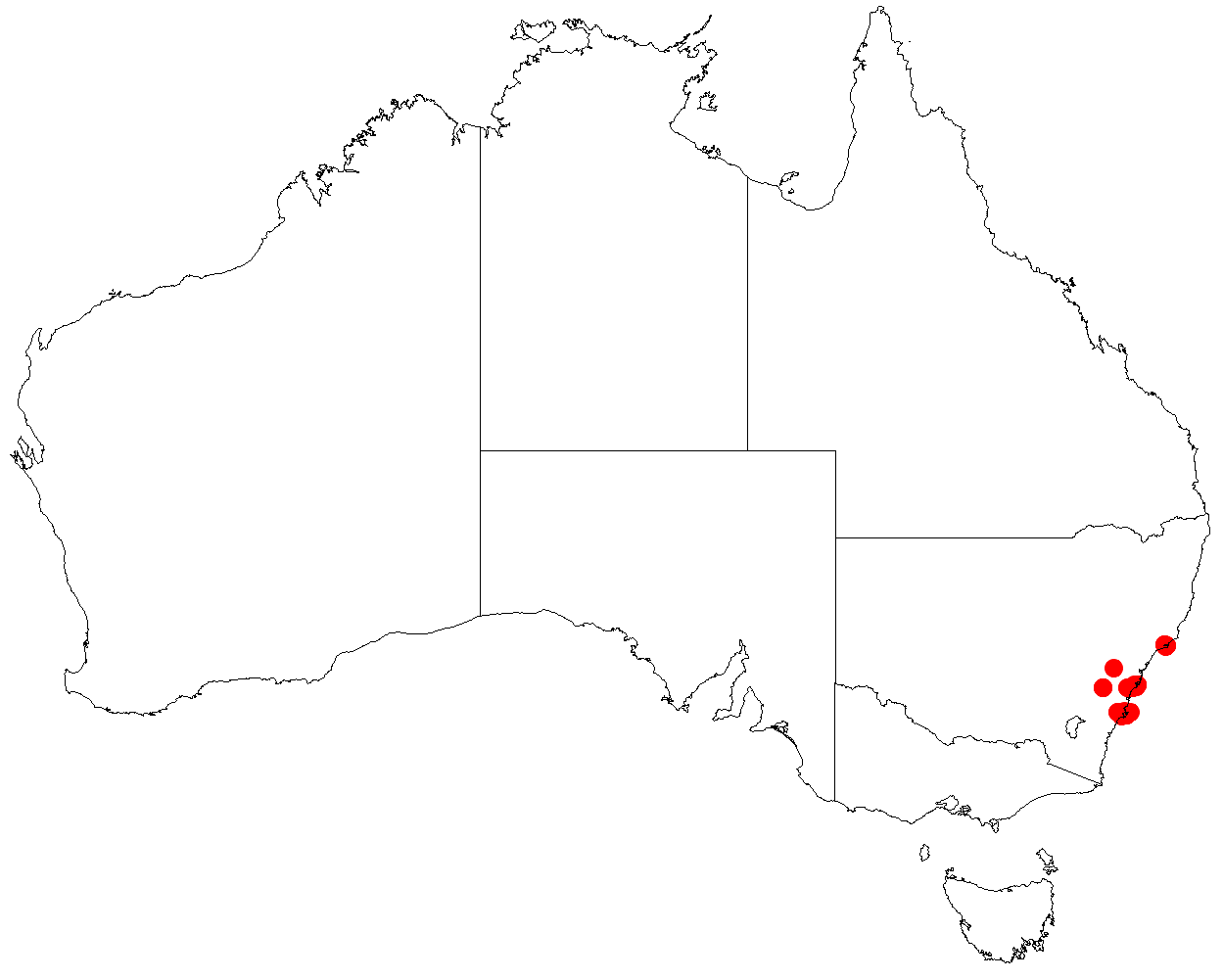
- Occurrence data from AVH

= Prostanthera densa =

Villous mint-bush

Species of flowering plant

Prostanthera densa, commonly known as villous mint-bush, is a species of flowering plant in the family Lamiaceae and is endemic to near-coastal areas of New South Wales. It is an erect, often compact shrub with aromatic branches, egg-shaped leaves, and mauve flowers with orange markings inside.

== Description ==
Prostanthera densa is an erect, aromatic, often compact shrub that typically grows to a height of 0.5–2 m (1 ft 8 in – 6 ft 7 in) and has hairy branches. The leaves are egg-shaped to triangular, usually hairy, 10–15 mm (0.39–0.59 in) long and 7–12 mm (0.28–0.47 in) wide on a petiole 1–1.5 mm (0.039–0.059 in) long. The flowers are arranged singly in two to ten of the upper leaf axils with bracteoles about 5 mm (0.20 in) long at the base. The sepals are hairy, sometimes tinged with purple, 6.5–8 mm (0.26–0.31 in) long and form a tube about 4 mm (0.16 in) wide with two lobes, the upper lobe 3–3.5 mm (0.12–0.14 in) long. The petals are pale mauve to mauve with orange and white markings, 12–15 mm (0.47–0.59 in) long, forming a tube 6–8 mm (0.24–0.31 in) long. The lower central lobe is 6.5–10 mm (0.26–0.39 in) long, the lower side lobes 2.5–5 mm (0.098–0.197 in) long and the upper lobes 3–4.5 mm (0.12–0.18 in) long and fused with a central notch 1.5–2 mm (0.059–0.079 in) long. There are a few flowers throughout the year, peaking in spring.

== Taxonomy and naming ==
Prostanthera densa was first formally described in 1920 by Arthur Andrew Hamilton in Proceedings of the Linnean Society of New South Wales.

== Distribution and habitat ==
Villous mint-bush grows in forest and shrubland on the coast and nearby ranges between Nelson Bay and the Beecroft Peninsula.

== Conservation status ==
This mintbush is listed as "vulnerable" under the Australian Government Environment Protection and Biodiversity Conservation Act 1999 and the New South Wales Government Biodiversity Conservation Act 2016. The main threats to the species include land clearing for urban development, dieback caused by Phytophthora cinnamomi, dumping of garden refuse, weed invasion and disturbance by recreational users.
