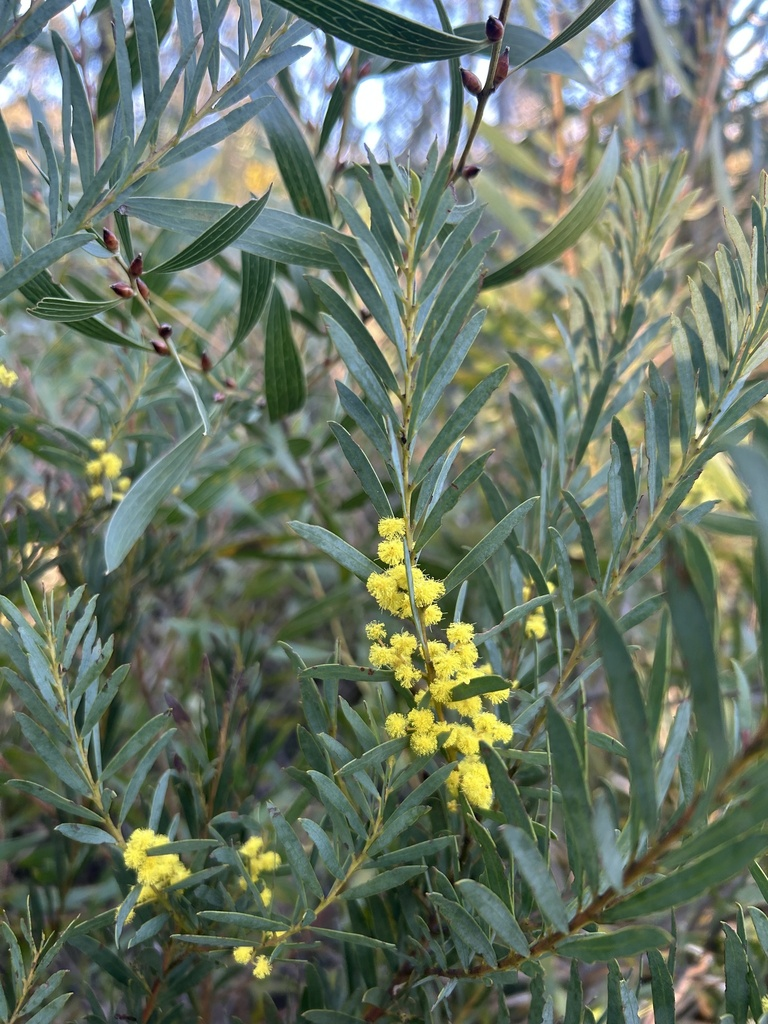
- In Morton National Park

Scientific classification
- Kingdom: Plantae
- Clade: Tracheophytes
- Clade: Angiosperms
- Clade: Eudicots
- Clade: Rosids
- Order: Fabales
- Family: Fabaceae
- Subfamily: Caesalpinioideae
- Clade: Mimosoid clade
- Genus: Acacia
- Species: A. hamiltoniana

Binomial name
- Acacia hamiltoniana Maiden
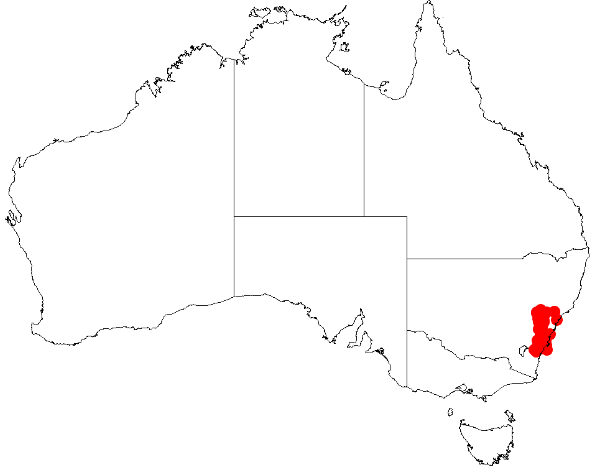
- Occurrence data from AVH

Synonyms
- Acacia linearifolia A.Cunn. manuscript name; Acacia obtusata var. hamiltoni Maiden orth. var.; Acacia obtusata var. hamiltonii Maiden; Acacia sieberiana Tausch nom. inval., nom. nud.; Racosperma hamiltonianum (Maiden) Pedley; Acacia crassiuscula auct. non H.L.Wendl.: Bentham, G. (5 October 1864), Flora Australiensis

= Acacia hamiltoniana =

Hamilton's wattle

Species of legume

Acacia hamiltoniana, commonly known as Hamilton's wattle, is a species of flowering plant in the family Fabaceae and is endemic to New South Wales, Australia. It is an erect, bushy shrub with ascending to erect linear to lance-shaped or narrowly elliptic phyllodes, spherical heads of golden yellow flowers and firmly papery to thinly leathery, more or less black pods.

== Description ==
Acacia hamiltoniana is an erect or spreading, bushy shrub that typically grows to a height of 0.5–3 m (1 ft 8 in – 9 ft 10 in) with glabrous, finely ribbed, dark red branchlets. Its phyllodes are mostly ascending to erect, variably shaped, linear to lance-shaped with the narrower end towards the base, or narrowly elliptic, 30–60 mm (1.2–2.4 in) long, 2.5–5 mm (0.098–0.197 in) wide and glaucous to subglaucous with a vein on each side. The flowers are borne in spherical heads in racemes 5–40 mm (0.20–1.57 in) long on peduncles 2.5–3.5 mm (0.098–0.138 in) long, each head with nine to fifteen golden yellow flowers. Flowering occurs in August and September and the pods are up to 55 mm (2.2 in) long and about 10 mm (0.39 in) wide, firmly papery to thinly leathery, glabrous and more or less black. The seeds are oblong to elliptic or egg-shaped, 4–5 mm (0.16–0.20 in) long, somewhat shiny black with a club-shaped aril.

== Taxonomy ==
Acacia hamiltoniana was first formally described in 1920 by the botanist Joseph Maiden in the Journal and Proceedings of the Royal Society of New South Wales, from specimens collected by Arthur Andrew Hamilton near Leura. The specific epithet (hamiltoniana) honours Hamilton, who collected the type specimen in 1907.

== Distribution and habitat ==
Hamilton's wattle occurs on the Great Dividing Range and its foothills from near Rylstone and south to the Clyde River where it grows in sandy or loamy soils on sandstone outcrops in heath, Eucalyptus forest or woodland.

== See also ==
- List of Acacia species
