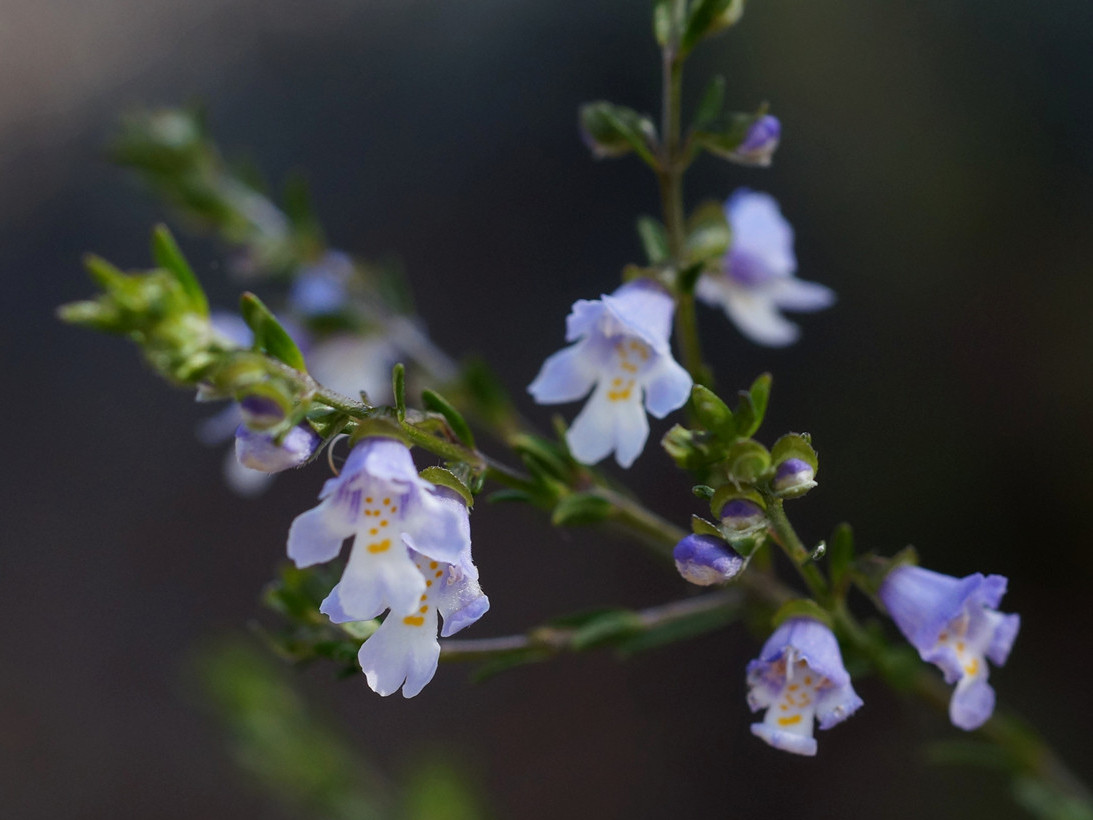

Scientific classification
- Kingdom: Plantae
- Clade: Tracheophytes
- Clade: Angiosperms
- Clade: Eudicots
- Clade: Asterids
- Order: Lamiales
- Family: Lamiaceae
- Genus: Prostanthera
- Species: P. saxicola

Binomial name
- Prostanthera saxicola R.Br.
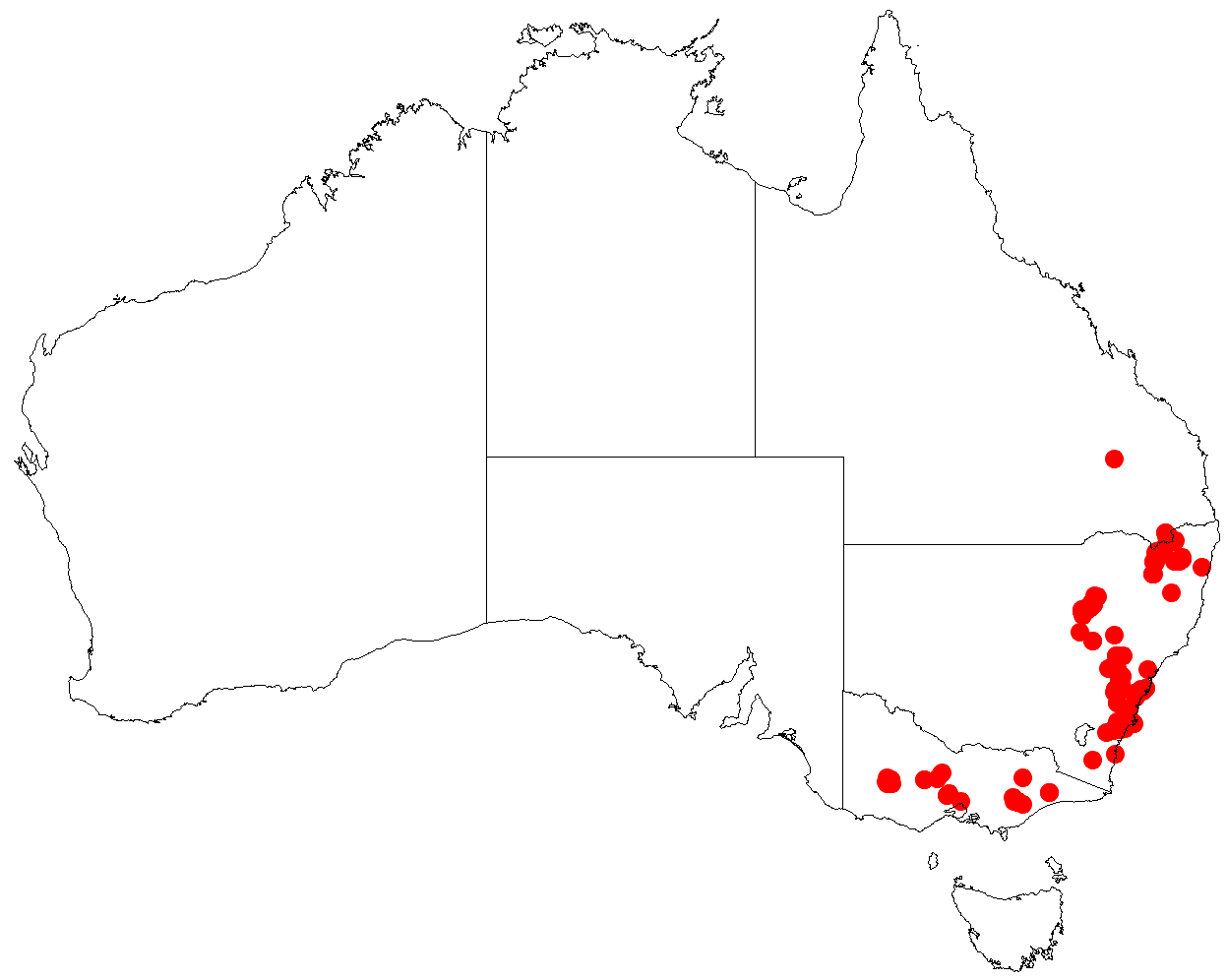
- Occurrence data from AVH

= Prostanthera saxicola =

Species of flowering plant

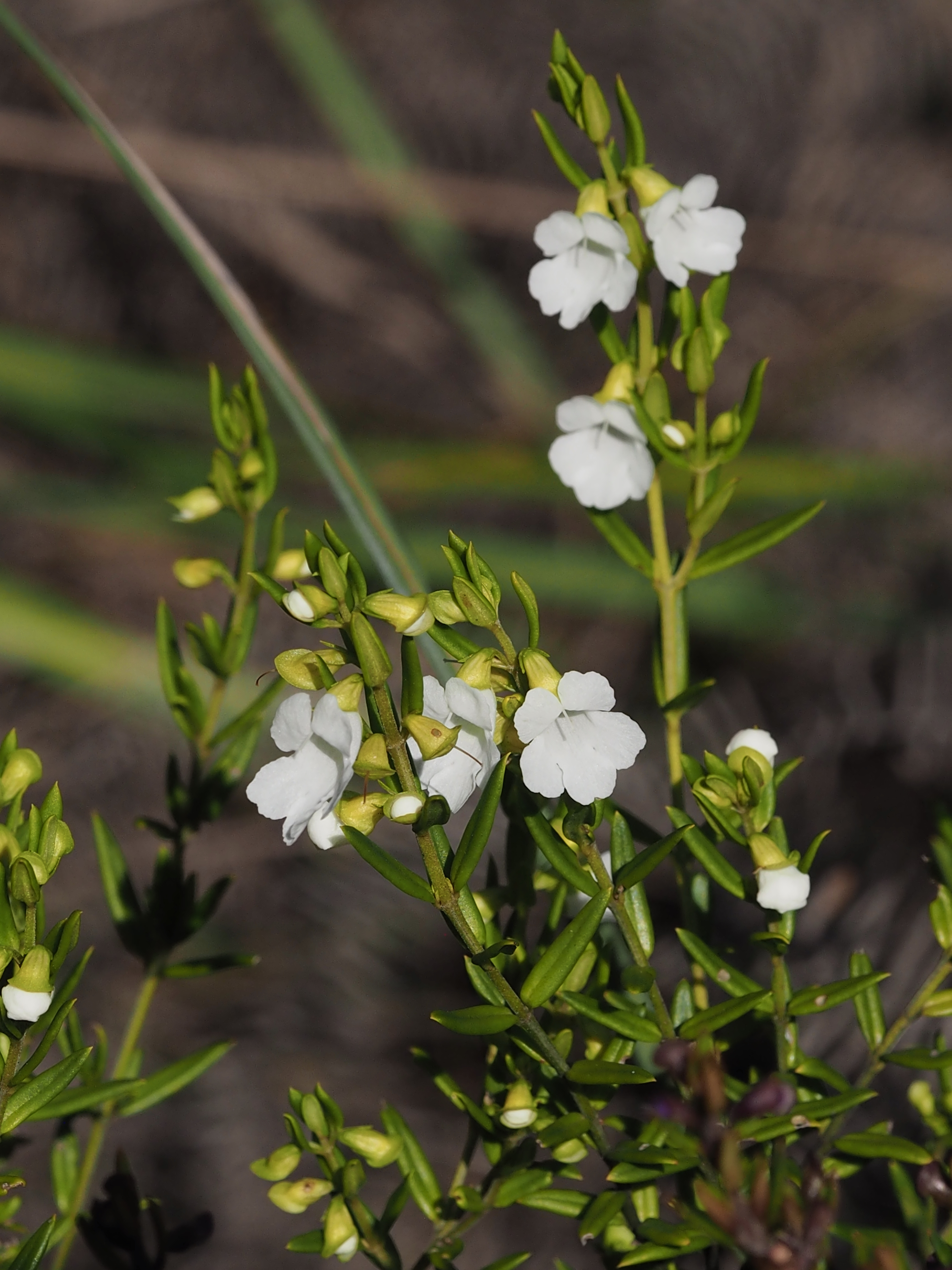
Var. major in the Gibraltar Range National Park

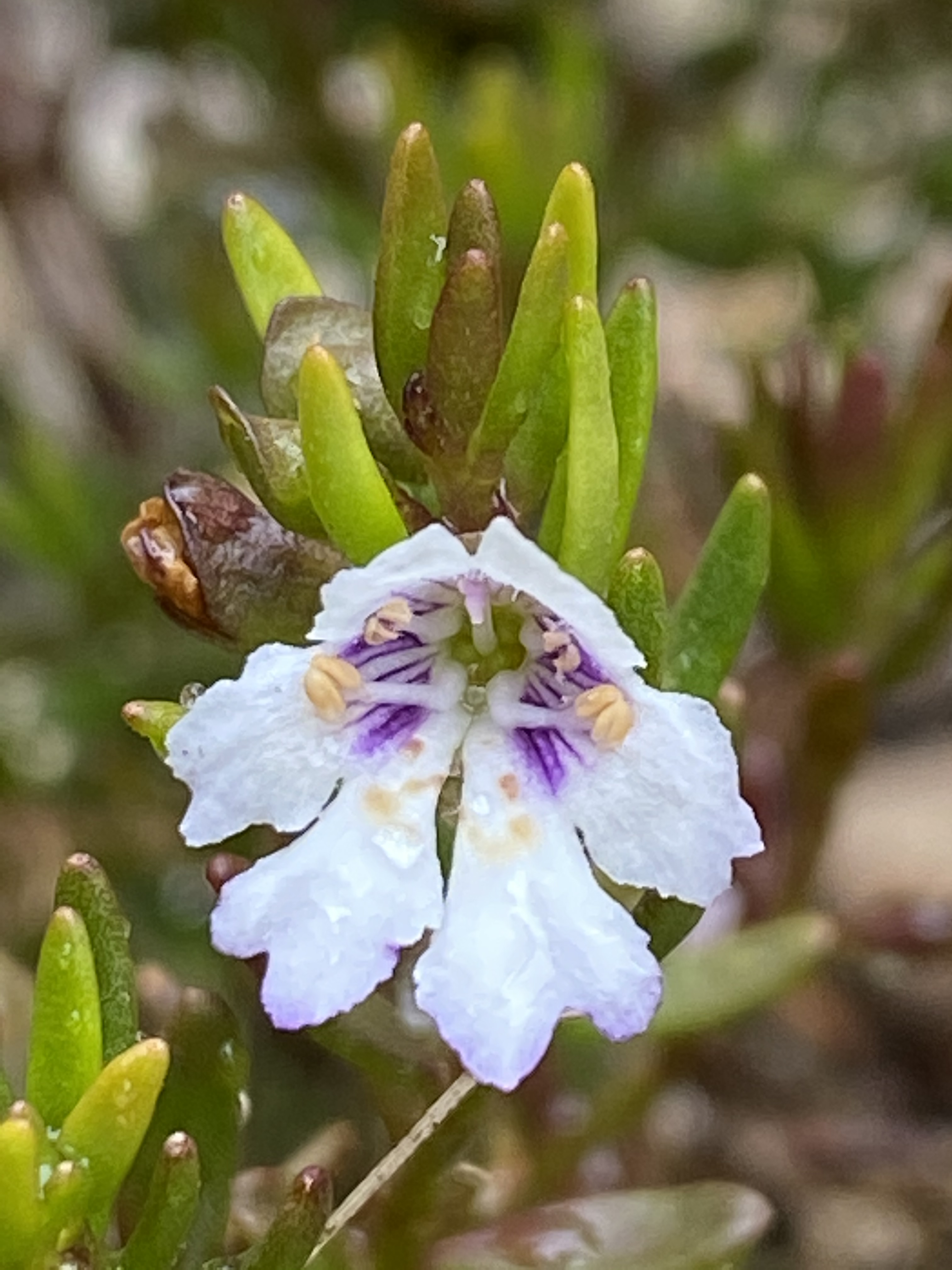
Var. montana

Prostanthera saxicola is a species of flowering plant in the family Lamiaceae and is endemic to eastern Australia. It is a shrub with linear to elliptic leaves and white to mauve flowers arranged in leaf axils.

== Description ==
Prostanthera saxicola is a prostrate to erect, spreading to compact shrub that typically grows to a height of 0.2–2 m (7.9 in – 6 ft 6.7 in) and sometimes has branches covered with white hairs flattened against the stem and more or less sessile glands. Its leaves are linear to elliptic, 3–15 mm (0.12–0.59 in) long and 1–6 mm (0.039–0.236 in) wide on a petiole up to 1 mm (0.039 in) long. The flowers are borne in leaf axils with bracteoles 0.5–3 mm (0.020–0.118 in) long at the base, the sepals 4–6 mm (0.16–0.24 in) long forming a tube 2–3.5 mm (0.079–0.138 in) long with two lobes, the upper lobe 1.5–4 mm (0.059–0.157 in) long. The petals are white to mauve and 8–15 mm (0.31–0.59 in) long. Flowering occurs between July and February.

== Taxonomy ==
Prostanthera saxicola was first formally described in 1810 by Robert Brown in his treatise Prodromus Florae Novae Hollandiae et Insulae Van Diemen.

Four varieties have been described, the names accepted by the Australian Plant Census:

- Prostanthera saxicola var. bracteolata J.H.Willis, an erect to prostrate shrub 0.1–2 m (3.9 in – 6 ft 6.7 in) tall with scattered, linear to narrow oblong or lance-shaped leaves 5–9 mm (0.20–0.35 in) long and 0.5–2 mm (0.020–0.079 in) wide, flowers with bracteoles 1.6–3 mm (0.063–0.118 in) long and white to pale mauve or bluish petals;
- Prostanthera saxicola var. major Benth., a much-branched shrub 0.6–1.2 mm (0.024–0.047 in) tall with narrow elliptic to oblong leaves 5–14 mm (0.20–0.55 in) long and 1–3 mm (0.039–0.118 in) wide densely arranged along the stems, flowers with bracteoles about 1.5 mm (0.059 in) long and mauve to white petals with yellow spots inside the petal tube;
- Prostanthera saxicola var. montana A.A.Ham., a low-lying to prostrate shrub up to 1 m (3 ft 3 in) tall with crowded, slightly leathery elliptic leaves 6–15 mm (0.24–0.59 in) long and 2–6 mm (0.079–0.236 in) wide, the flowers with bristly bracteoles about 0.5 mm (0.020 in) long and white petals with purple stripes inside the petal tube;
- Prostanthera saxicola A.A.Ham. var. saxicola, a slender shrub 0.1–0.8 m (3.9 in – 2 ft 7.5 in) tall with linear leaves 3–7 mm (0.12–0.28 in) long and 1–2 mm (0.039–0.079 in) wide scattered along the stems, and flowers with bracteoles 1–2 mm (0.039–0.079 in) long and mauve petals.

== Distribution and habitat ==
This mintbush is widely distributed from south-eastern Queensland, through eastern New South Wales and in scattered places in Victoria. It grows in woodland and forest, and often in heath. Variety bracteolata, commonly known as slender mint-bush, is found in south-eastern Queensland and from the Pilliga forest to the Kanangra-Boyd National Park in New South Wales. It is the only variety occurring in Victoria. Variety major grows in heath in south-eastern Queensland and the Gibraltar Range National Park in New South Wales. Variety montana occurs in south-eastern New South Wales and var. saxicola in eastern New South Wales.

== Conservation status in Queensland ==
Both varieties of P. saxicola (major and bracteolata) found in Queensland are listed as of "least concern" under the Queensland Government Nature Conservation Act 1992.
