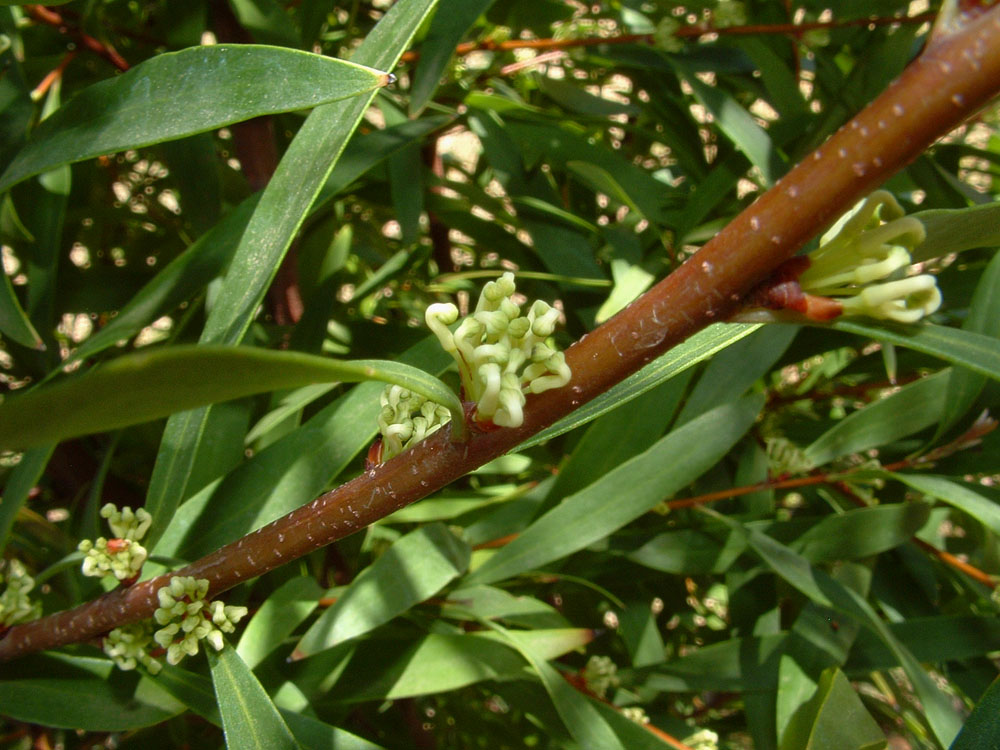

Scientific classification
- Kingdom: Plantae
- Clade: Tracheophytes
- Clade: Angiosperms
- Clade: Eudicots
- Order: Proteales
- Family: Proteaceae
- Genus: Hakea
- Species: H. salicifolia

Binomial name
- Hakea salicifolia (Vent.) B.L.Burtt
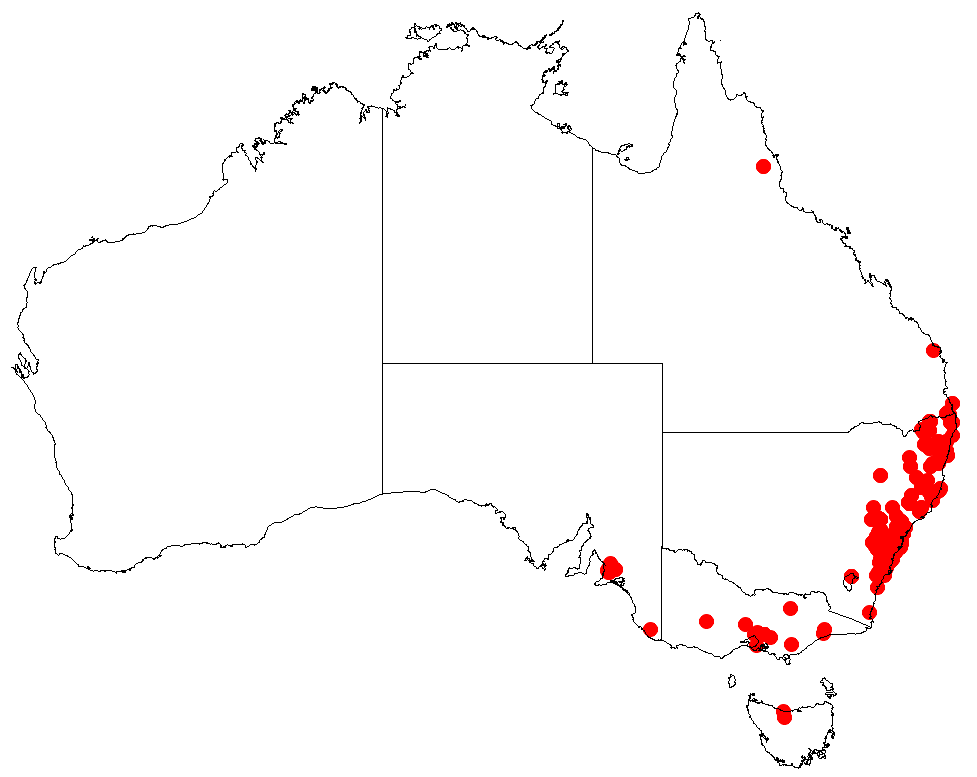
- Occurrence data from Australasian Virtual Herbarium

Synonyms
- Conchium salicifolium C.F.Gaertn.; Embothrium salicifolium Vent.; Hakea salicifolia Meisn. nom. inval., pro syn.

= Hakea salicifolia =

Willow-leaved hakea

Species of plant endemic to eastern Australia

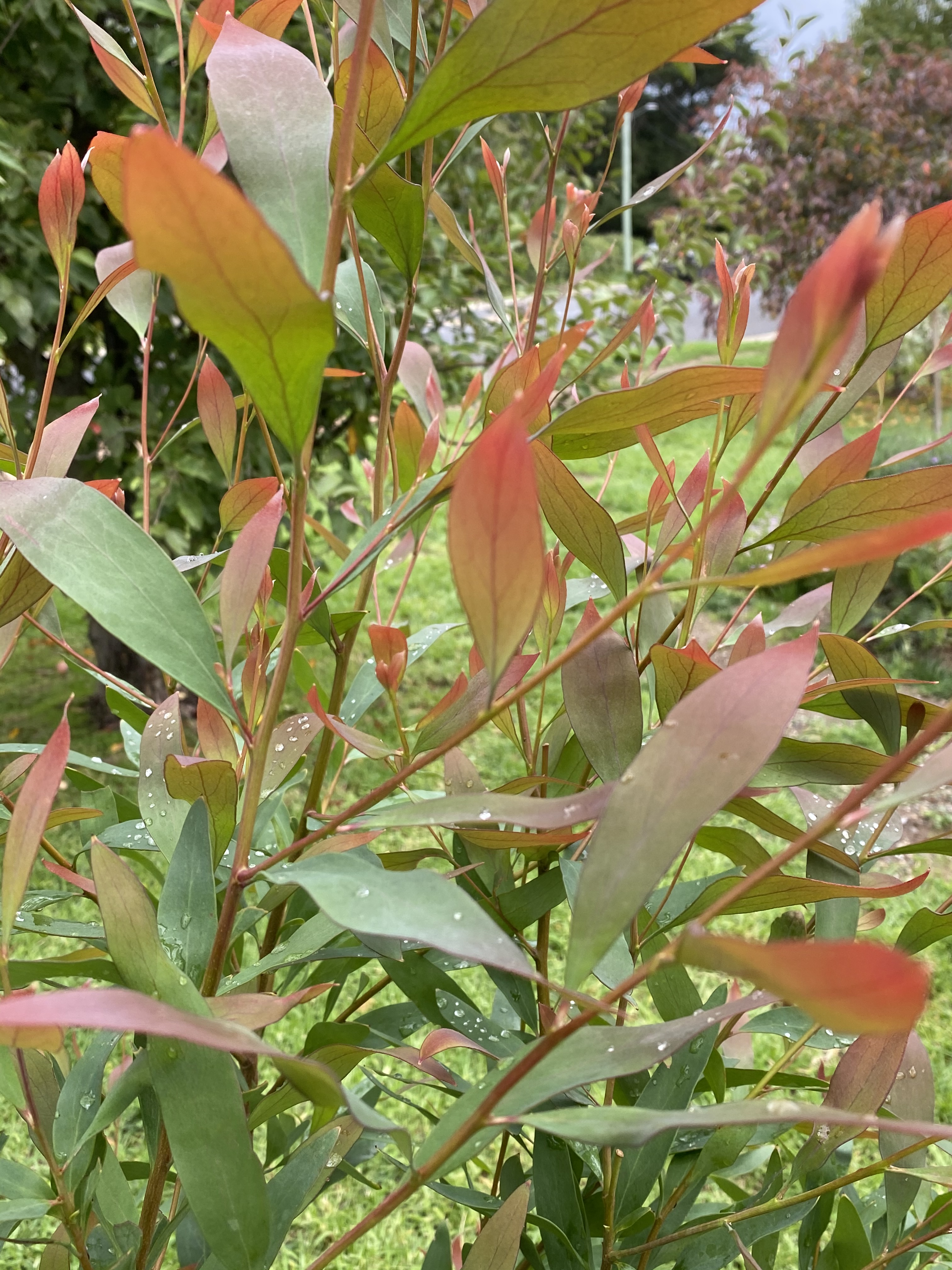
New growth

Hakea salicifolia, commonly known as the willow-leaved hakea, is a species of flowering plant that is endemic to eastern Australia. It is an adaptable, fast growing small tree or shrub with attractive foliage and cream white flowers.

== Description ==
Hakea salicifolia is a fast-growing upright shrub or small tree to 3–5 m (10–20 ft) tall. Smaller branches are smooth with obvious dark red longitudinal ribbing. Young shoots have sparse silky hairs or may be totally hairless. Leaves are narrowly oval shaped, widest in the middle up to 12 cm long and 5–20 mm (0.2–0.8 in) wide tapering to a point or occasionally rounded at the apex. The pale green leaves are smooth, occasionally bluish-green with a powdery film. Young leaves are darker with sparse flattened silky white and rusty coloured hairs quickly becoming smooth. The inflorescence consists of a single umbel of 16–28 white to pale yellow flowers on a short stalk 1–1.5 mm (0.04–0.06 in) long. The young flower bracts are 3 mm (0.1 in) long and slightly hairy externally. The pedicel is 4.5–7 mm (0.2–0.3 in) long. The perianth is smooth, bluish-green with a powdery film and 2.3–3.5 mm (0.09–0.1 in) long. The style 6–6.5 mm (0.2–0.3 in) long. Egg-shaped fruit are 2.3–3.5 cm (0.9–1 in) long and 1.3–3 cm (0.5–1 in) wide narrowing gradually to a slightly upturned beak with small horns. The fruit surface is covered with black blister-like warts 1–5 mm (0.04–0.2 in) high.

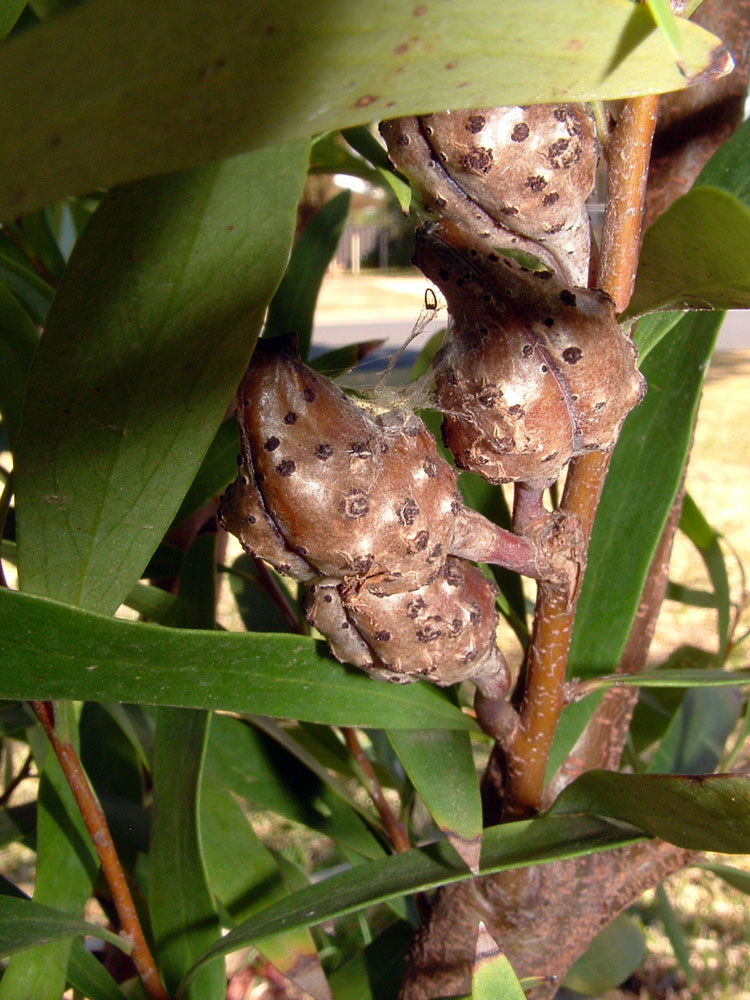
Fruit

== Taxonomy and naming ==
Willow-leaved hakea was first formally described in 1800 by French botanist Étienne Pierre Ventenat who gave it the name Embrothium salicifolium and published the description in Description des Plantes Nouvelles et peu connues, cultivees dans le Jardin de J.M. Cels. The type specimen was grown in the garden of Jacques Philippe Martin Cels from material collected from Botany Bay in 1792. In 1941, English botanist Brian Burtt changed the name to Hakea salicifolia and published the description in Bulletin of Miscellaneous Information. The specific epithet (salicifolia) is derived from the Latin words salix meaning "willow" and folium meaning "leaf" referring to the willow-like leaves.

Two subspecies are currently recognised by the Australian Plant Census:

- Hakea salicifolia (Vent.) B.L.Burtt subsp. salicifolia that has leaves more than 7 mm (0.28 in) wide and grows on the coast and ranges from Springbrook, Queensland to Jervis Bay, New South Wales;
- Hakea salicifolia subsp. angustifolia (A.A.Ham.) W.R.Barker that has leaves 4–7 mm (0.16–0.28 in) wide and grows near water courses between Hornsby and Helensburgh in the Sydney region.

Hakea saligna var. angustifolia was first formally described in 1920 by Arthur Andrew Hamilton in Proceedings of the Linnean Society of New South Wales before being renamed Hakea salicifolia subsp. angustifolia in 1999 by William Robert Barker.

== Distribution and habitat ==
Hakea salicifolia is a widespread species growing mainly from Kempsey to the Shoalhaven River, Dorrigo, Whian Whian and the Blue Mountains. Also found near the Queensland and New South Wales border. Grows in wet sclerophyll forest often near rainforest.

== Ecology ==
Willow-leaved Hakea is an invasive plant species in New Zealand and is listed by the New Zealand Department of Conservation as one of about 300 environmental weeds. It is also invasive in Portugal. An attractive ornamental tree adaptable to most soils and aspects from sub-tropical to temperate zones creating issues with over abundance of the species in some localities. Planted on tea plantations in Tanzania as a wind-break and boundary hedge.
