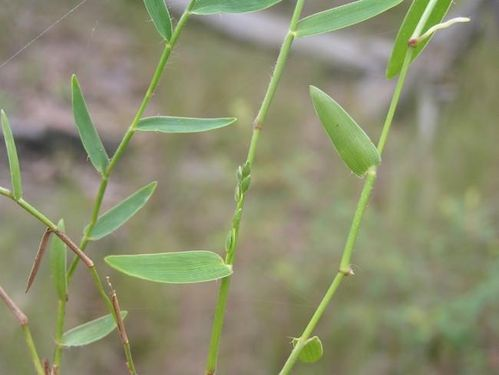

Scientific classification
- Kingdom: Plantae
- Clade: Tracheophytes
- Clade: Angiosperms
- Clade: Monocots
- Clade: Commelinids
- Order: Poales
- Family: Poaceae
- Subfamily: Panicoideae
- Tribe: Paniceae
- Subtribe: Cleistochloinae
- Genus: Simonachne; E.J.Thomps.
- Species: S. maidenii

Binomial name
- Simonachne maidenii (A.A.Ham.) E.J.Thomps.

Synonyms
- Ancistrachne maidenii (A.A.Ham.) Vickery; Eriochloa maidenii A.A.Ham.

= Simonachne =

Genus of grasses

Simonachne maidenii is a species of grass (in the family Poaceae) endemic to New South Wales. It is the sole species in genus Simonachne.

It is a scrambling perennial grass with slender, rigid horizontal stems and branches which ascend.

The leaves have sheathes which are sparsely hairy and the ligule is fringed. The racemes are terminal or axillary, and about 4 centimetres (1.6 in) long, with the lateral racemes being shorter and partially enclosed by the sheath. When mature the spikelets (2.5–3 mm long ) fall entirely. The upper glume has five nerves. The lower lemma (similar to the upper glume), has seven nerves and is sterile. The fertile florets are elliptic to lanceolate, with nerves which are obscure. It flowers in summer, and grows on sandstone soils, north of Sydney.

The species was first described as Eriochloa maidenii by the botanist Arthur Hamilton in 1913, and in 1961 Joyce Vickery revised it to Ancistrachne maidenii. The specific epithet honours Joseph Maiden, In 2022 Edward John Thompson placed the species in a new monotypic genus Simonachne.

In New South Wales, this species is listed as "threatened".
