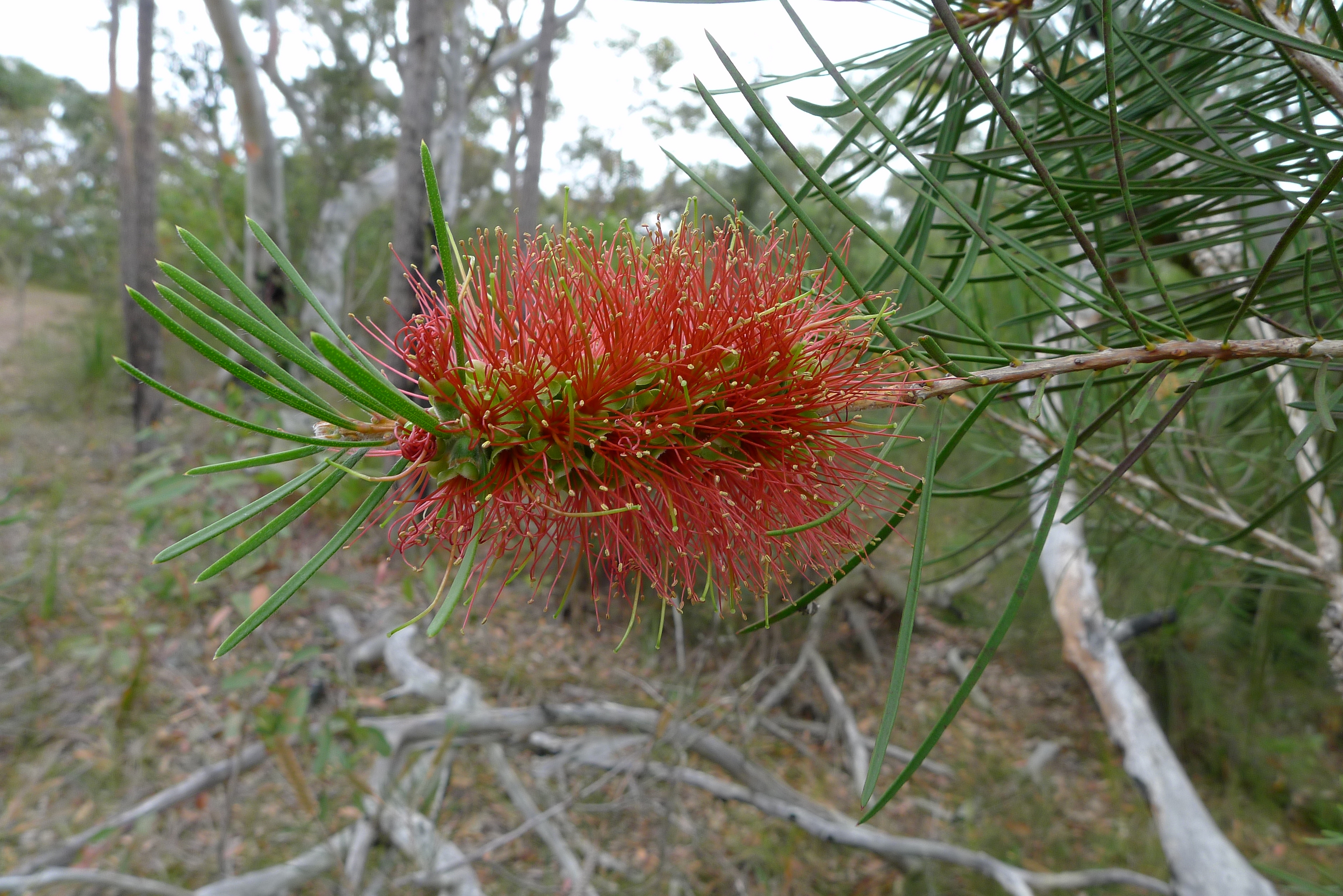
- Melaleuca linearis in the Royal National Park

Scientific classification
- Kingdom: Plantae
- Clade: Tracheophytes
- Clade: Angiosperms
- Clade: Eudicots
- Clade: Rosids
- Order: Myrtales
- Family: Myrtaceae
- Genus: Melaleuca
- Species: M. linearis

Binomial name
- Melaleuca linearis Schrad. & J.C.Wendl.

Synonyms
- Callistemon linearis (Schrad.] & J.C.Wendl.) Colvill ex Sweet; Metrosideros linearis (Schrad.] & J.C.Wendl.) Sm.

= Melaleuca linearis =

Narrow-leaved bottlebrush

Species of flowering plant

Melaleuca linearis, commonly known as narrow-leaved bottlebrush, is a plant in the myrtle family, Myrtaceae and is endemic to New South Wales and Queensland in Australia. It is a medium-sized shrub with narrow leaves with a rigid point, and red flower spikes in late spring or early summer.

== Description ==
Melaleuca linearis is a shrub growing to 3 metres (10 ft) tall with grey, hard, fibrous bark. Its leaves are arranged alternately and are 35–115 millimetres (1–5 in) long, 0.7–2.7 millimetres (0.03–0.1 in) wide, narrow linear in shape and flat to channelled or semi-circular in cross section. There is a mid-vein but the lateral veins are inconspicuous.

The flowers are a shade of red, rarely green and arranged in spikes on the ends of branches that continue to grow after flowering and also on the sides of the branches. The spikes are 40–65 millimetres (2–3 in) in diameter and 5–10 centimetres (2.0–3.9 in) long with 20 to 90 individual flowers. The petals are 3.2–7 millimetres (0.1–0.3 in) long and fall off as the flower ages and there are 23–73 stamens in each flower. Flowering occurs from late spring to early summer and is followed by fruits that are woody capsules, 3.8–8.2 millimetres (0.1–0.3 in) long.

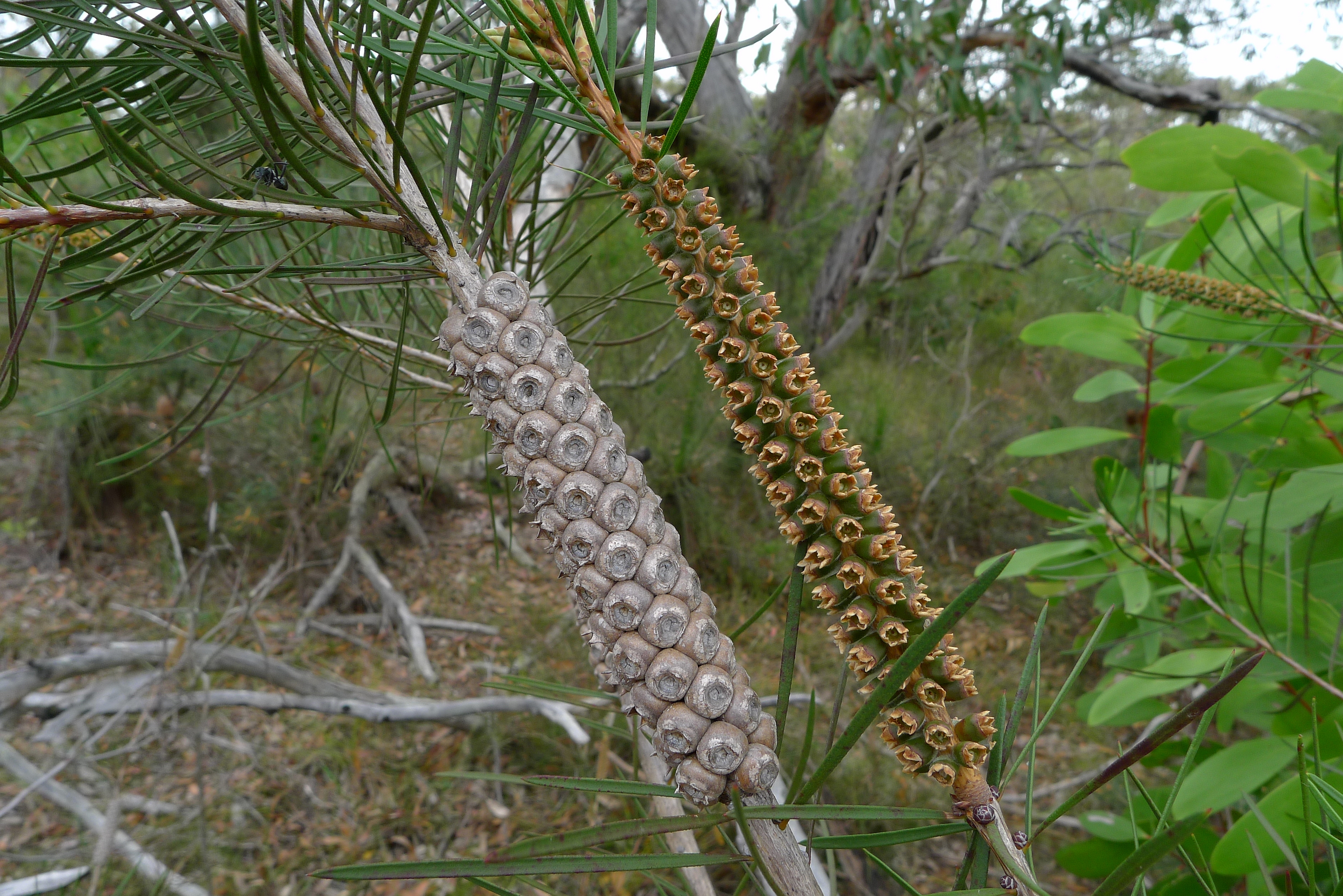
Mature and immature capsules

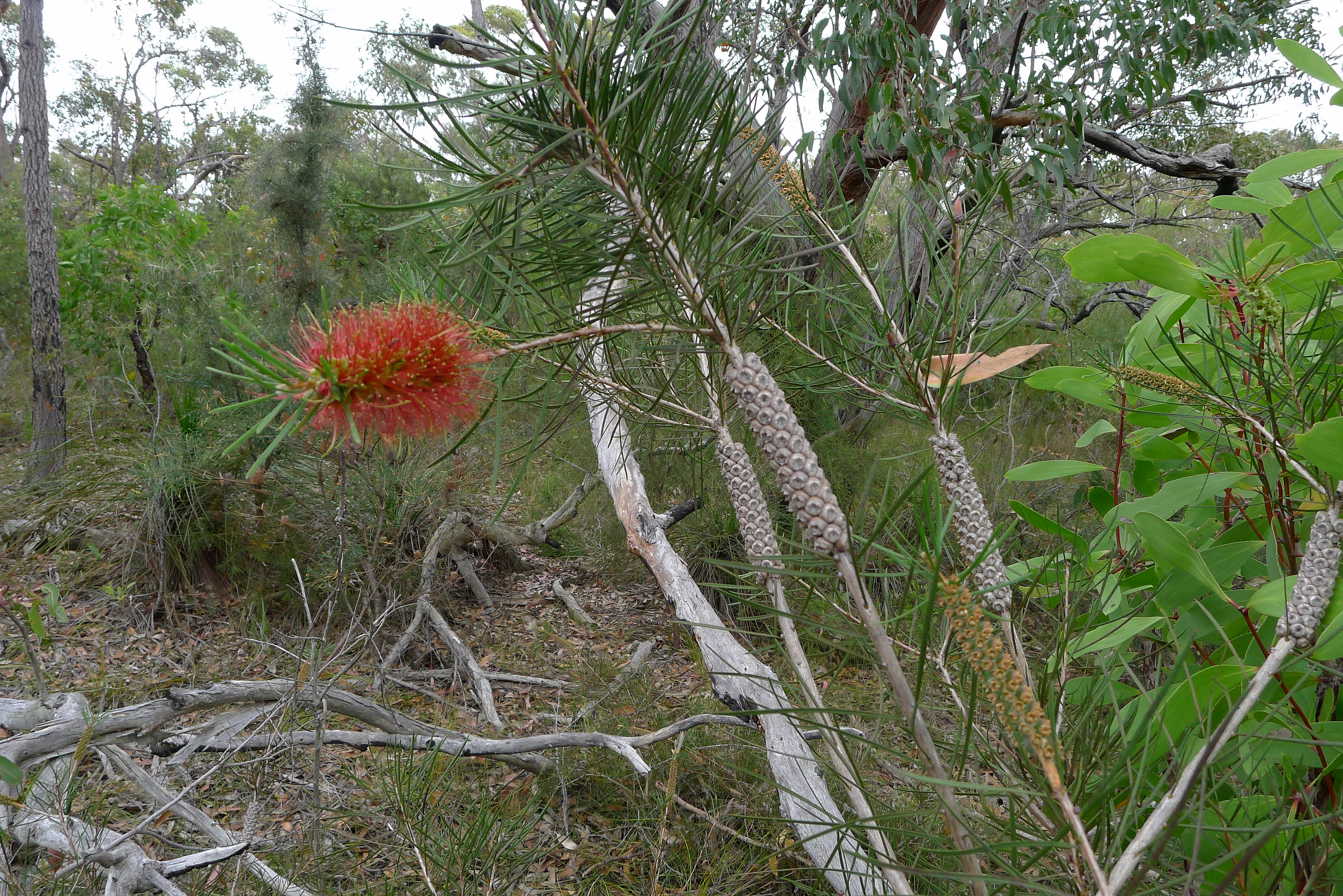
Growth habit

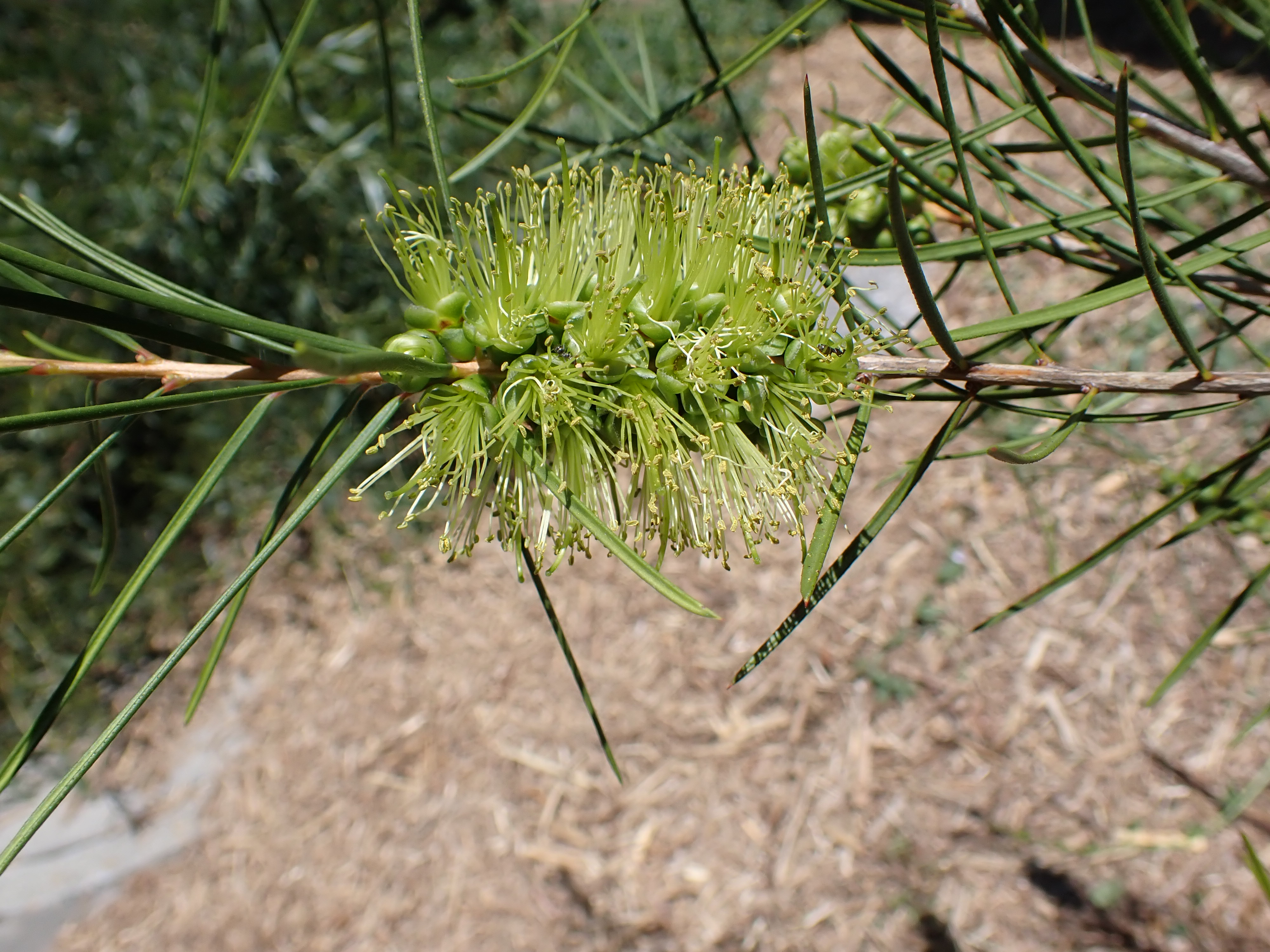
Green flowered form

== Taxonomy and naming ==
Melaleuca linearis was first formally described in 1796 by Heinrich Schrader and Johann Christoph Wendland in Sertum Hannoveranum. The specific epithet (linearis) is a Latin word linearis meaning "linear" in reference to the shape of the leaves of this species.

In 2006, Craven described two varieties of Melaleuca linearis in the journal Novon:

- Melaleuca linearis Schrad. & J.C.Wendl. var. linearis has leaves that are more than 1.3 millimetres (0.05 in) wide, usually 23–33 stamens per flower and occurs in Queensland south to the Coonabarabran and Narrabri districts in New South Wales and also in and between the Central Coast and Nowra districts in New South Wales.
- Melaleuca linearis var. pinifolia (J.C.Wendl.) Craven has leaves that are less than 1.3 millimetres (0.05 in) wide, 34–73 stamens per flower and occurs in the Gilgandra, Kandos and Sydney districts in New South Wales.

=== Synonymy ===
Plants of the World Online regards Callistemon linearis as a synonym of M. linearis, C. pinifolius as a synonym of M. linearis var. acerosa (although this variety, named by Tausch has not been formally described) and C. rigidus as a synonym of M. linearis var. linearis. It further considers M. linearis var. pinifolia to be a synonym of M. linearis var. acerosa. However, the National Herbarium of New South Wales retains the names Callistemon linearis, Callistemon pinifolius and Callistemon rigidus.

The Australian Plant Census considers M. linearis to be a synonym of C. linearis, M. linearis var. pinifolia a synonym of C. pinifolius, and C. rigidus a synonym of C. linearis.

A 2012 paper in the journal Muelleria suggested that if Callistemon were to be subsumed into Melaleuca, there would be "no morphological characters to uniquely define it (Melaluca)". Indeed, in a 2014 paper in Taxon, Craven and others proposed transferring Beaufortia, Calothamnus, Conothamnus, Eremaea, Lamarchea, Phymatocarpus and Regelia to Melaleuca, a change largely accepted by Plants of the World Online, but not by any Australian authority.

(Plants of the World Online considers Regelia to be a synonym of Verschaffeltia.)

== Distribution and habitat ==
Melaleuca linearis occurs in and between the south-east corner of Queensland, Nowra on the south coast of New South Wales and inland as far as Gilgandra. It grows in damp situations in a range of vegetation associations.

== Use in horticulture ==
Melaleuca linearis has long been in cultivation (as Callistemon linearis, C. pinifolius and C. rigidus). Although not common in gardens, it is a hardy plant, thriving in most soils but preferring full sun. It is more resistant to pests such as sawfly than other melaleucas. It has received the Royal Horticultural Society's Award of Garden Merit.
