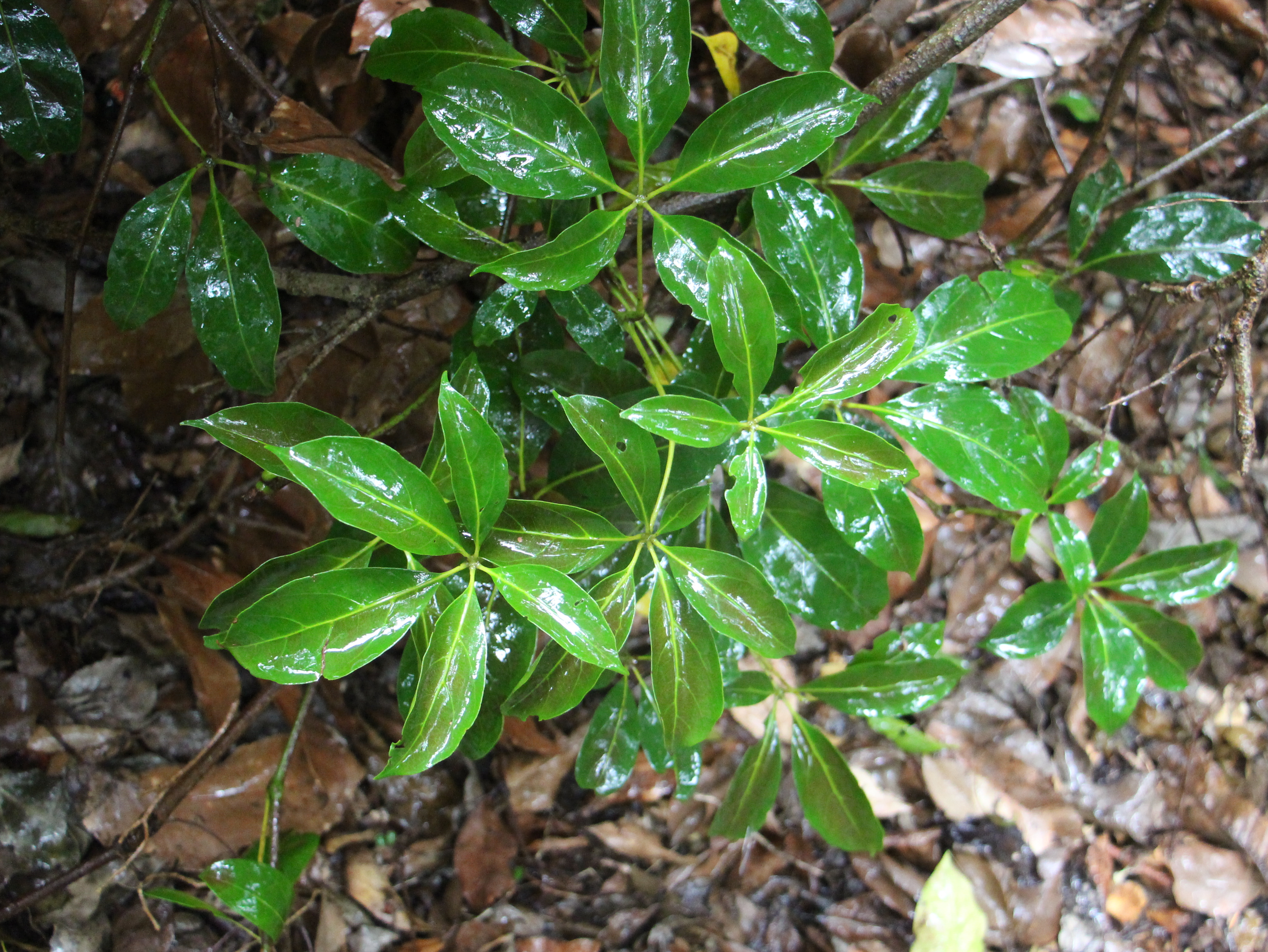
- vine at Mount Keira, Australia

Scientific classification
- Kingdom: Plantae
- Clade: Tracheophytes
- Clade: Angiosperms
- Clade: Eudicots
- Clade: Rosids
- Order: Vitales
- Family: Vitaceae
- Genus: Cissus
- Species: C. sterculiifolia

Binomial name
- Cissus sterculiifolia (F.Muell. ex Benth.) Planch.

= Cissus sterculiifolia =

Yaroong

Species of vine

Cissus sterculiifolia, the Yaroong, is a widespread vine, though not particularly common, found in rainforests north of Jervis Bay to Queensland in eastern Australia.
