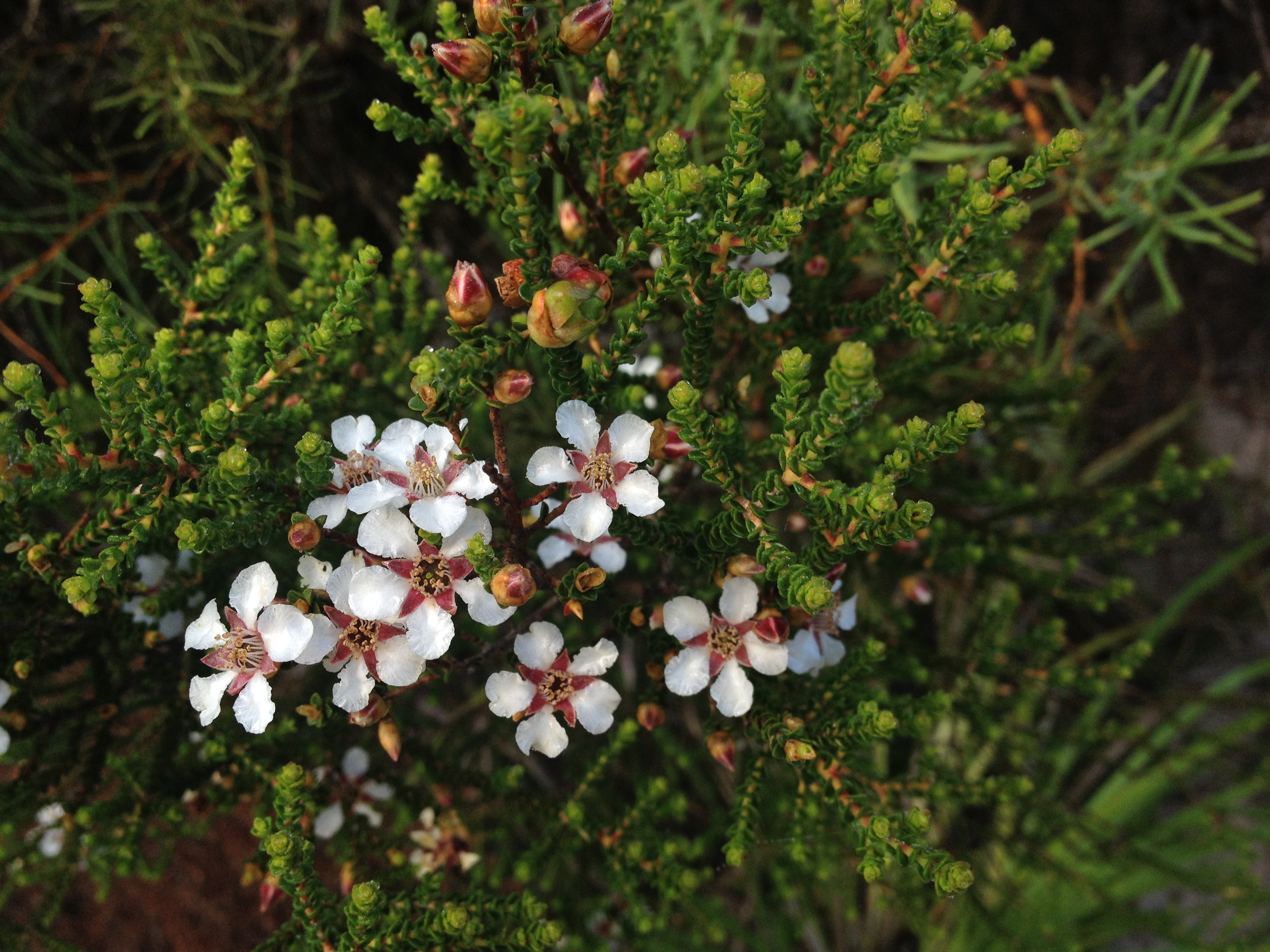

Scientific classification
- Kingdom: Plantae
- Clade: Tracheophytes
- Clade: Angiosperms
- Clade: Eudicots
- Clade: Rosids
- Order: Myrtales
- Family: Myrtaceae
- Genus: Leptospermum
- Species: L. epacridoideum

Binomial name
- Leptospermum epacridoideum Cheel
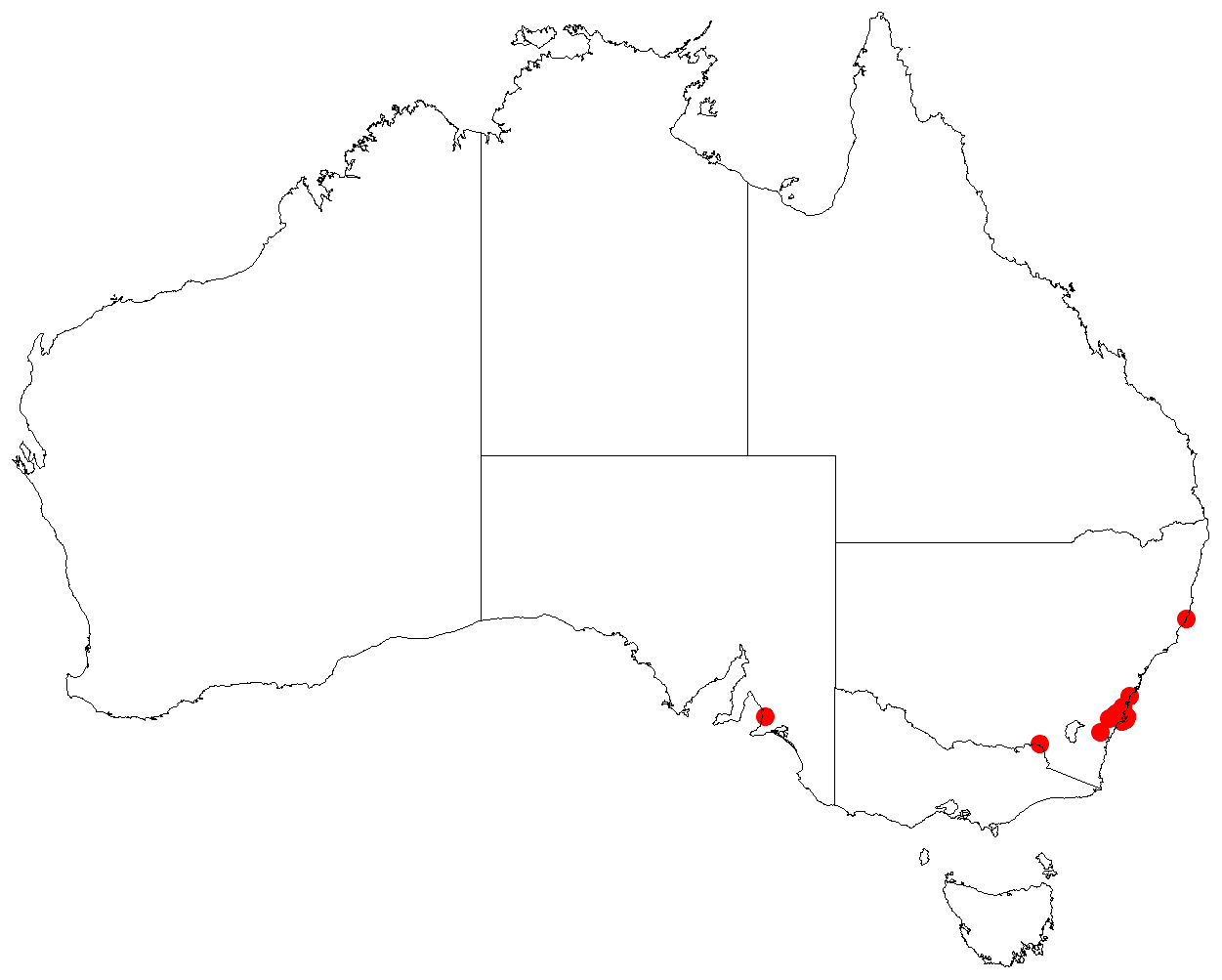
- Occurrence data from AVH

Synonyms
- Leptospermum epacridioideum Cheel orth. var.

= Leptospermum epacridoideum =

Species of flowering plant

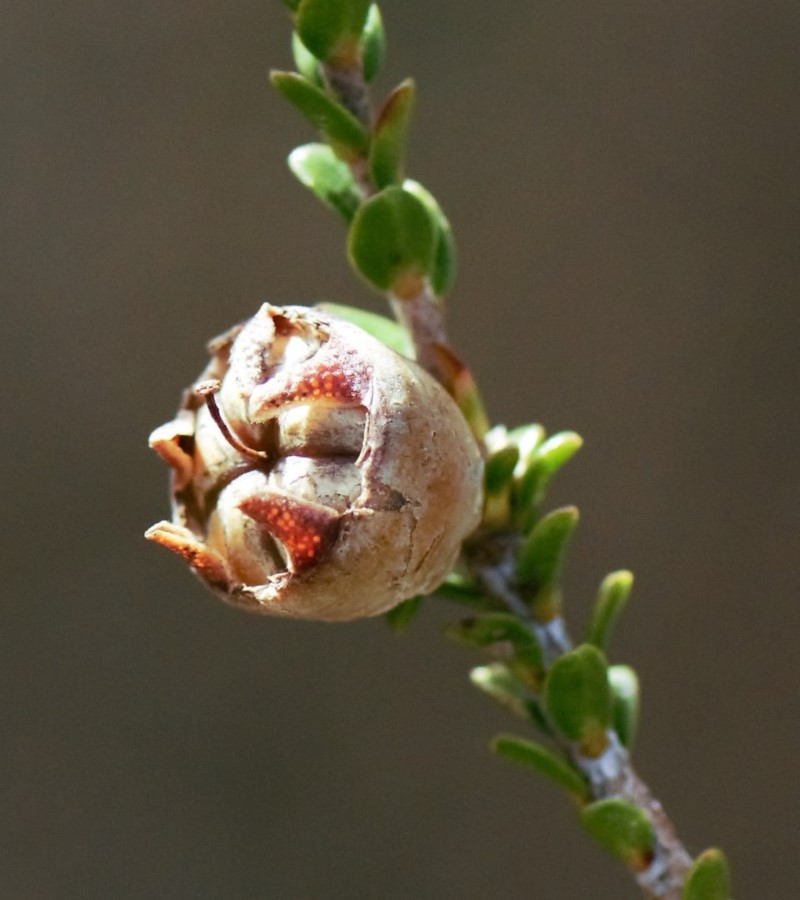
Fruit

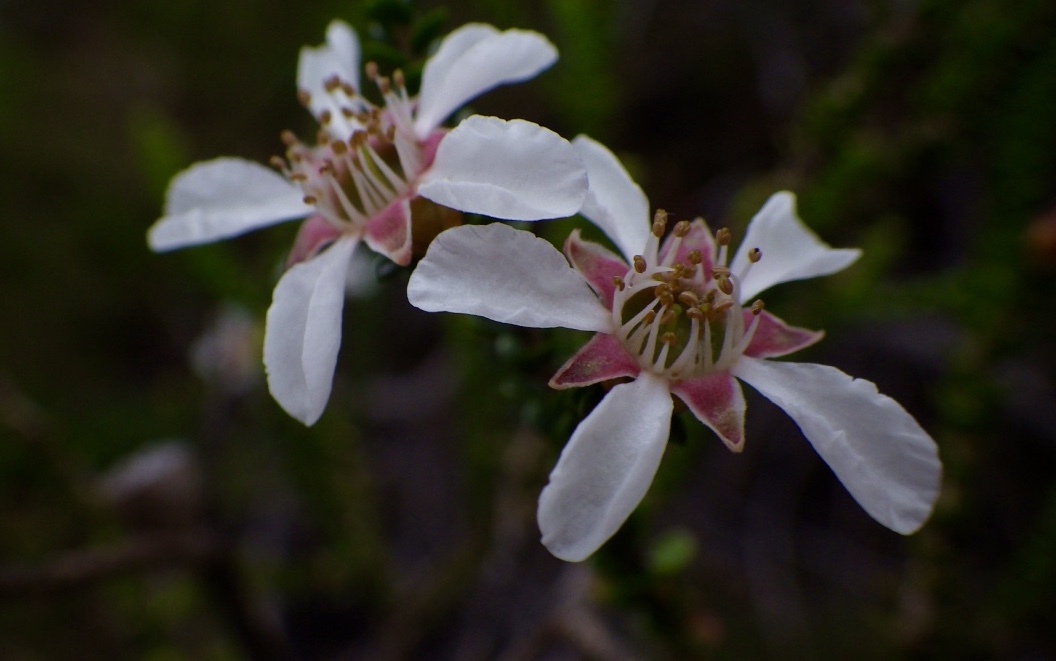
Flower detail

Leptospermum epacridoideum is a species of plant that is endemic to a restricted area of the South Coast of New South Wales. It is a bushy shrub with compact bark, elliptical to more or less circular leaves, white flowers arranged singly on short axillary side shoots, and woody fruit.

== Description ==
Leptospermum epacridoideum is a bushy, more or less erect shrub that typically grows to a height of 1–2 m (3 ft 3 in – 6 ft 7 in). The younger stems are thick and covered with tiny, fine hairs. The leaves are broadly elliptical to more or less circular, 2–3 mm (0.079–0.118 in) long and about 2 mm (0.079 in) wide on a short, thick petiole. The flowers are white or pink, usually borne singly on short side branches, and are about 6–10 mm (0.24–0.39 in) in diameter. There are reddish brown bracts and bracteoles around the base of the flower. The floral cup is glabrous and about 3 mm (0.12 in) long. The sepals are long-triangular, about 3.5 mm (0.14 in) long with soft hairs. The petals are about 5 mm (0.20 in) long and the stamens are in bundles of between five and seven and are about 2.5 mm (0.098 in) long. Flowering mainly occurs from February to March and the fruit is a sessile, woody capsule 6–8 mm (0.24–0.31 in) that eventually falls off.

== Taxonomy ==
Leptospermum epacridoideum was formally described in 1919 by Edwin Cheel in the Journal and Proceedings of the Royal Society of New South Wales, originally incorrectly as Leptospermum epacridioideum.

== Distribution and habitat ==
This tea-tree grows in forest and heath on sandstone in the area around Jervis Bay.
