= Arthur Andrew Hamilton =

Australian botanist (1855–1929)

- Born: 1855
- Died: 1929 (aged 73–74)
- Scientific career
- Fields: Botany, spermatophytes
- Author abbrev. (botany): A.A.Ham.

Arthur Andrew Hamilton (1855–1929) was an Australian botanist.

The standard author abbreviation A.A.Ham. is used to indicate this person as the author when citing a botanical name.

== Names published ==
- Ancistrachne maidenii (A.A.Ham.) Vickery (basionym: Eriochloa maidenii A.A.Ham.: Hamilton, A.A. (1913) A new Species of Eriochloa from the Hawkesbury River. Proceedings of the Linnean Society of New South Wales 37(4): 709.)
- Lepidosperma forsythii A.A.Ham.: Hamilton, A.A. (1910) A new species of Lepidosperma [N.O. Cyperaceae] from the Port Jackson district; with some miscellaneous botanical notes. Proceedings of the Linnean Society of New South Wales 35(2): 411.
- Lepidosperma quadrangulatum A.A.Ham.:Hamilton, A.A. (1920) Notes from the Botanic Gardens, Sydney. Proceedings of the Linnean Society of New South Wales 45(2): 261.
- Prostanthera densa A.A.Ham.: Hamilton, A.A. (1920) Notes from the Botanic Gardens, Sydney. Proceedings of the Linnean Society of New South Wales 45(2): 263.
- Prostanthera saxicola var. montana A.A.Ham.: Hamilton, A.A. (1920) Notes from the Botanic Gardens, Sydney. Proceedings of the Linnean Society of New South Wales 45(2): 263.
- Hakea salicifolia subsp. angustifolia (A.A.Ham.) W.R.Barker (basionym: Hakea saligna var. angustifolia A.A.Ham.:Hamilton, A.A. (1920) Notes from the Botanic Gardens, Sydney. Proceedings of the Linnean Society of New South Wales 45(2): 261)
- Grevillea punicea var. crassifolia A.A.Ham.: Hamilton, A.A. (1920) Notes from the Botanic Gardens, Sydney. Proceedings of the Linnean Society of New South Wales 45(2): 261

For further names see the International Plant Name Index.

== Publications ==
- (1918) Topographical, ecological, and taxonomic notes on the ocean shoreline vegetation of the Port Jackson district
- (1912) A new Species of Eriochloa from the Hawkesbury River. Proceedings of the Linnean Society of New South Wales 37(4): 709.
- (1910) A new species of Lepidosperma (N.O. Cyperaceae) from the Port Jackson district; with some miscellaneous botanical notes. Proceedings of the Linnean Society of New South Wales 35(2): 411.
- (1920) Notes from the Botanic Gardens, Sydney. Proceedings of the Linnean Society of New South Wales 45(2): 260-264.
