= List of pubs in Australia =

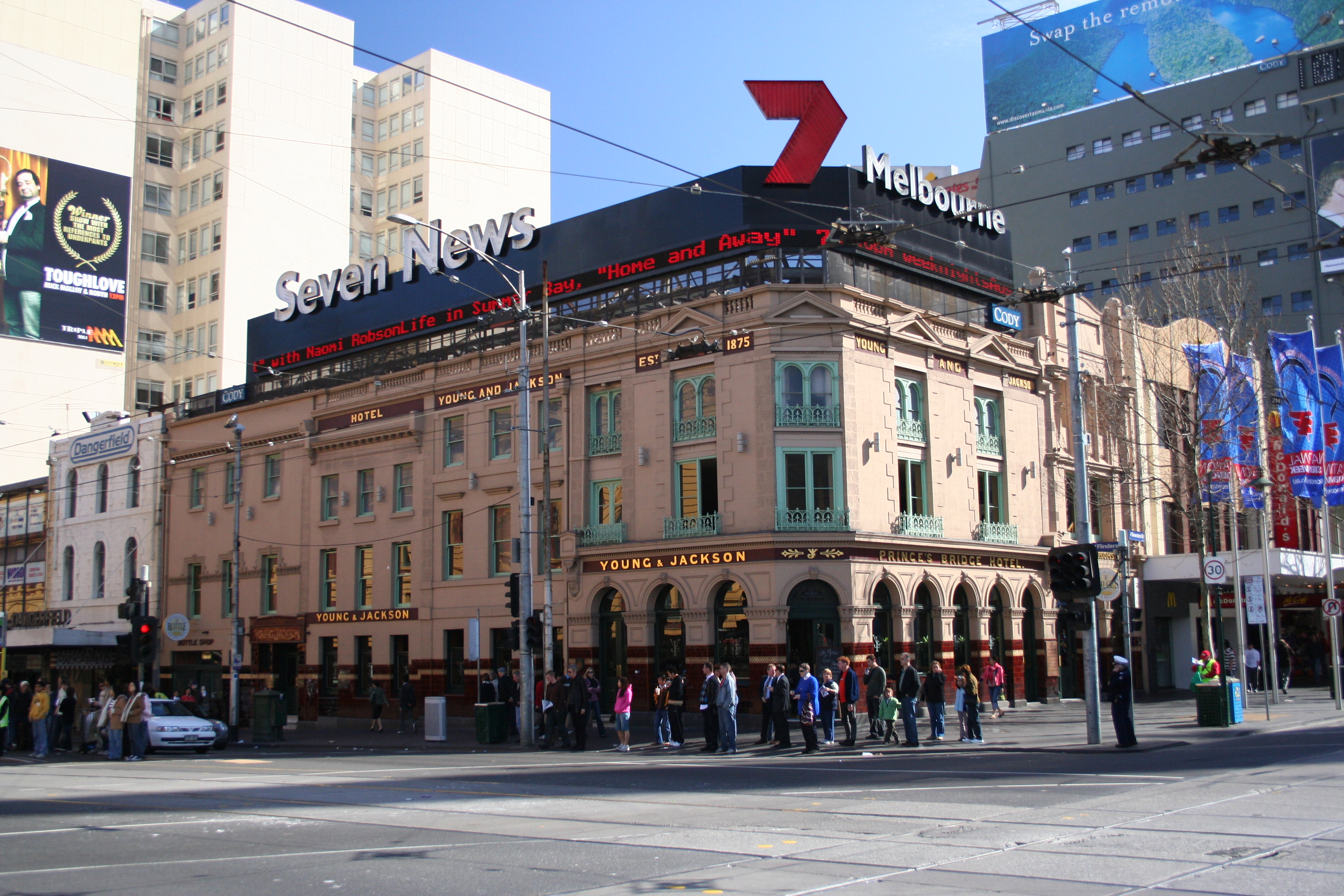
The Young and Jackson Hotel in Melbourne, Victoria, Australia

This is a list of notable pubs in Australia. An Australian pub is an establishment performing many functions. These include serving alcoholic beverages, meals, functioning as a venue for various kinds of entertainment, and, sometimes, providing basic accommodation.

== History ==
The Australian pub is a direct descendant of the British and Irish pub. The production and consumption of alcoholic drinks has long played a key role in Western social life and commerce, and this is reflected in the importance of pubs after the British colonisation of Australia began in 1788. However, in the 19th century the local version evolved a number of distinctive features that set it apart from the classic British or urban Irish pub.

The lack of public buildings in rural towns in colonial Australia saw pubs serve as community meeting places for a range of local activities. Among other things, they served as a community hall, a venue for political meetings and a place where inquests were held.

Early pubs followed the English pattern and were located in the front room of a domestic dwelling. The room in this "public house" were furnished with a bar, tables and benches, and there was often sawdust on the floor. They functioned under long established rules and regulations that governed every aspect of their operations. These required the publican to be of good character and pay an annual license fee. Regulations also specified hours of opening, who might and might not be served, the quality of drinks sold and mandated the provision of street lighting outside the entrance. Police and magistrates enforced these rules strictly, with fines and a possible loss of license for repeat offenders.

Early pubs were distinct from hotels, inns and large city centre pubs, which tended to be larger and more elaborate purpose-built establishments with a basement and one or more upper floors. As well as a tap-room, or public bar, they often provided a range of other facilities, such as accommodation, a dining room, stables, parlour and a billiard room.

Some tough inner-city pubs had a reputation for violence and disorder. In Australian slang, they might be referred to as a bloodhouse.

== Pubs in Australia ==
=== Australian Capital Territory ===
- Harmonie German Club
- Old Canberra Inn

=== New South Wales ===
Current

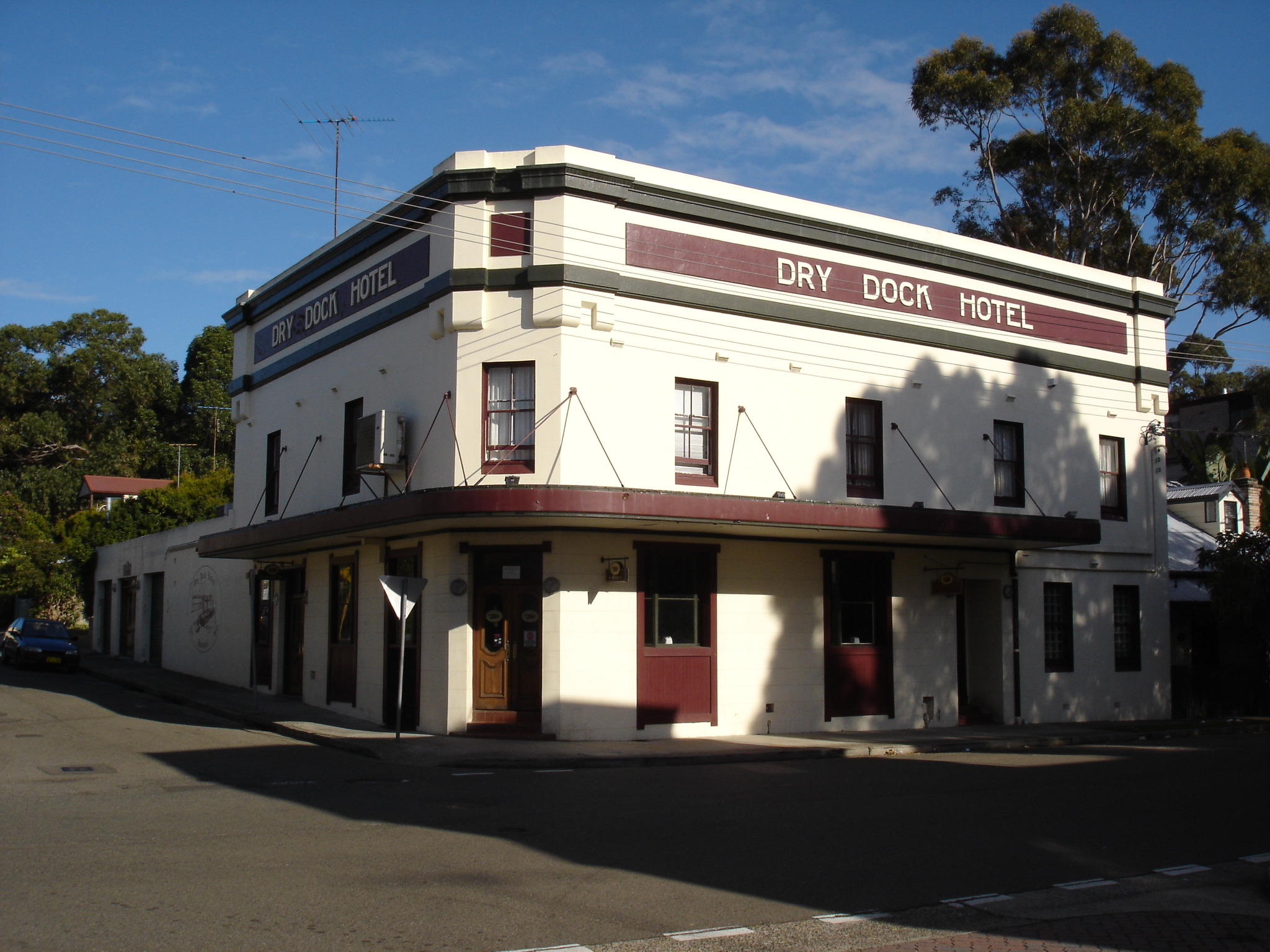
The Dry Dock Hotel is the oldest licensed pub in the suburb of Balmain in the Inner West of Sydney.

Metropolitan

- Argyle Stores, Sydney (The Rocks)
- Australian Hotel, Sydney (The Rocks) (previously defunct)
- Bald Rock Hotel, Rozelle
- Box Hill Inn, Balmain
- Bristol Arms Hotel, Sydney (CBD)
- British Seamen's Hotel, Sydney (The Rocks)
- Brooklyn Hotel, Sydney (The Rocks)
- Campbell's Stores, Sydney (The Rocks)
- Captain Cook Hotel, Sydney (Millers Point)
- Carlisle Castle Hotel, Newtown
- Crown Hotel, Sydney, Sydney (CBD)
- Dick's Hotel, Balmain
- Dry Dock Hotel, Balmain
- Dundee Arms Hotel, Sydney
- Ettamogah Pub, Kellyville
- Exchange Hotel, Balmain
- Fortune of War Hotel, Sydney (The Rocks) (previously defunct)
- Glenmore Hotel, Sydney (The Rocks)
- Harbour Rocks Hotel, Sydney (The Rocks)
- Harbour View Hotel, Sydney (Millers Point)
- Harts Buildings, Sydney (The Rocks)
- Hero of Waterloo Hotel, Sydney (Millers Point)
- Lord Nelson Hotel, Sydney (Millers Point)
- Old Sir Joseph Banks Hotel, Botany
- Riverview Hotel, Balmain
- Royal Oak Hotel, Balmain
- Sandringham Hotel, Newtown
- Ship Inn, Sydney (CBD)
- Sussex Hotel, Sydney (CBD)
- White Horse Hotel, Surry Hills
- Sir William Wallace Hotel, Birchgrove
- UNSW Venues, UNSW, Kensington

Regional

- Bushranger Hotel, Collector
- Commercial Hotel, Albury
- Eatons Group, Muswellbrook (previously defunct)
- Ettamogah Pub, Albury
- Fanny's Tavern, Newcastle
- Heritage Hotel, Bulli
- Hydro Majestic Hotel, Medlow Bath
- Milestone Hotel, Dubbo
- New Albury Hotel, Albury
- Newport Arms Hotel, Pittwater
- One Tree Hotel, One Tree
- The Oriental Hotel, Springwood
- Palace Hotel, Broken Hill
- Railway Hotel, Bogan Gate
- Royal Cricketers Arms Inn, Prospect
- Royal Hotel, Bathurst
- Royal Hotel, Cooma
- Wobbly Boot Hotel, Boggabilla

Defunct

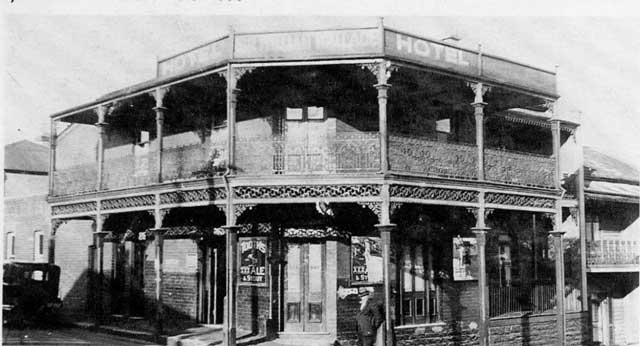
The Sir William Wallace Hotel, c. 1930.

- Albion Hotel, Balmain
- Albion Hotel, Braidwood
- Arcadia Hotel, Sydney (CBD)
- Beach Hotel, Rozelle
- Bogan Gate Hotel, Bogan Gate
- Bridge View Inn, Rylstone
- Brown's Family Hotel
- Carrington Hotel, Katoomba
- Court House Hotel, Windsor
- Forth & Clyde Hotel, Balmain
- The Garibaldi, Hunters Hill
- George Hotel, Sydney (CBD)
- Grand Hotel, Broadway
- Imperial Hotel, Rooty Hill
- Kent Hotel, Balmain
- Metropolitan Hotel, Sydney (CBD)
- Rising Sun Inn, Millfield
- Royal George Hotel, Sydney (CBD)
- Royal Oak Arms Hotel, Paterson
- Nubrygyn Inn and Cemetery, Euchareena
- Shipwright's Arms Hotel, Balmain East
- Star Hotel, Balmain
- Volunteer Hotel, Balmain
- Whalers Arms Hotel
- White Bay Hotel, Balmain
- Young Princess Hotel, Sydney (Millers Point)

=== Northern Territory ===
- Daly Waters Pub
- Hotel Darwin
- Humpty Doo Hotel
- Larrimah Hotel
- Stuart Arms Hotel
- Victoria Hotel, Darwin

=== Queensland ===
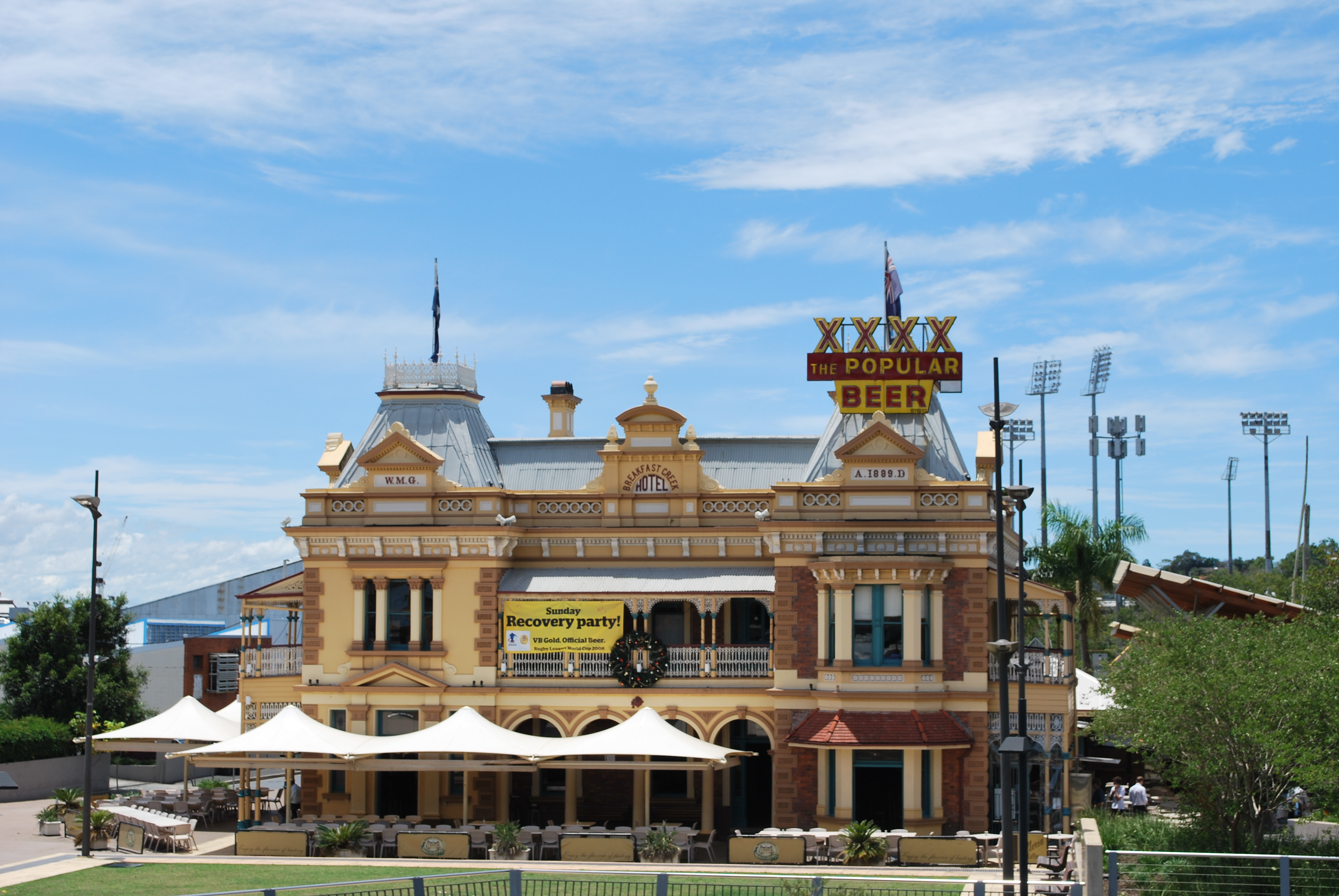
The Breakfast Creek Hotel is a heritage-listed hotel (pub) located in Breakfast Creek, Brisbane, Queensland.

- Babinda State Hotel
- Barrier Reef Hotel
- Barron Valley Hotel
- Bellevue Hotel, Brisbane
- Birdsville Hotel
- Bloomfield Lodge
- Bowen River Hotel
- Breakfast Creek Hotel
- Broadway Hotel, Woolloongabba
- Buchanan's Hotel
- Cairns Court House Complex
- Canberra Hotel, Brisbane
- Central Hotel, Cairns
- Central Hotel, Stanthorpe
- City View Hotel
- Cleveland Hotel
- Coronation Hotel
- Criterion Hotel, Maryborough
- Criterion Hotel, Rockhampton
- Criterion Hotel, Warwick
- Customs House Hotel, Maryborough
- Dusit Thani Brookwater Golf and Spa Resort
- Einasleigh Hotel
- Empire Hotel, Fortitude Valley
- Engineers' Arms Hotel
- Eureka Hotel
- Exchange Hotel, Laidley
- Exchange Hotel, Mossman
- Federal Hotel, Childers
- Forest Hill Hotel
- Fortitude Valley Post Office
- Four Points by Sheraton Brisbane
- Gambaro Group
- Grand Hotel, Childers
- Grand Hotel, Mount Morgan
- Grand View Hotel
- Great Northern Hotel, Townsville
- Heritage Hotel
- Hides Hotel
- Holiday Inn, Townsville
- Hotel Cecil (Southport)
- Hotel Cecil, North Ipswich
- Hotel Childers
- Hotel Corones
- Hotel Francis
- Hotel Metropole, Ipswich
- Imperial Hotel, Ravenswood
- Inchcolm, Spring Hill
- Irlam's Ant Bed Building
- Jubilee Hotel
- Lake Eacham Hotel
- Lakes Creek Hotel
- Langham Hotel, Warwick
- Lees Hotel
- Lockyer Hotel
- Mana Bar
- Manor Apartment Hotel
- Marburg Hotel
- National Hotel, Warwick
- Nebo Hotel
- Nindigully Pub
- Noccundra Hotel
- Norman Hotel
- Normanby Hotel
- Oddfellows Home Hotel
- Orient Hotel, Brisbane
- Palace Hotel, Childers
- Palazzo Versace Australia
- Parson's Inn
- People's Palace, Brisbane
- Plough Inn
- Port Office Hotel
- Post Office Hotel, Maryborough
- Prince Consort Hotel
- Quartz Hill Coach Change Station
- Queen's Hotel, Townsville
- Queensland National Hotel
- Railway Hotel, Gympie
- Railway Hotel, Ravenswood
- Range Hotel site, Hervey Range
- Regatta Hotel
- Royal Bull's Head Inn
- Royal Exchange Hotel, Brisbane
- Royal George Hotel and Ruddle's Building
- Royal Hotel, Birdsville
- Royal Hotel, Maryborough
- Royal Mail Hotel, Hungerford
- Shell House, Brisbane
- Sheraton Mirage Port Douglas Resort
- Stonehouse, Moore
- Tattersalls Hotel, Townsville
- The Grand Hotel, Hughenden
- The Pink Poodle
- The Reef Hotel Casino
- The Star Gold Coast
- Towers of Chevron Renaissance
- Transcontinental Hotel
- Treasury Casino
- Treasury Hotel
- Ulster Hotel
- Victoria Park Hotel
- Victory Hotel
- Waterloo Bay Hotel
- West End Hotel, Townsville
- White Horse Hotel, Toowoomba
- White Swan Inn, Swan Creek
- Wickham Hotel

=== South Australia ===
- Exeter Hotel
- Highercomb Hotel
- Largs Pier Hotel
- Pier Hotel, Glenelg

=== Tasmania ===
- The Bush Inn, Tasmania
- Hope and Anchor Tavern
- The Deloraine Hotel

=== Victoria ===
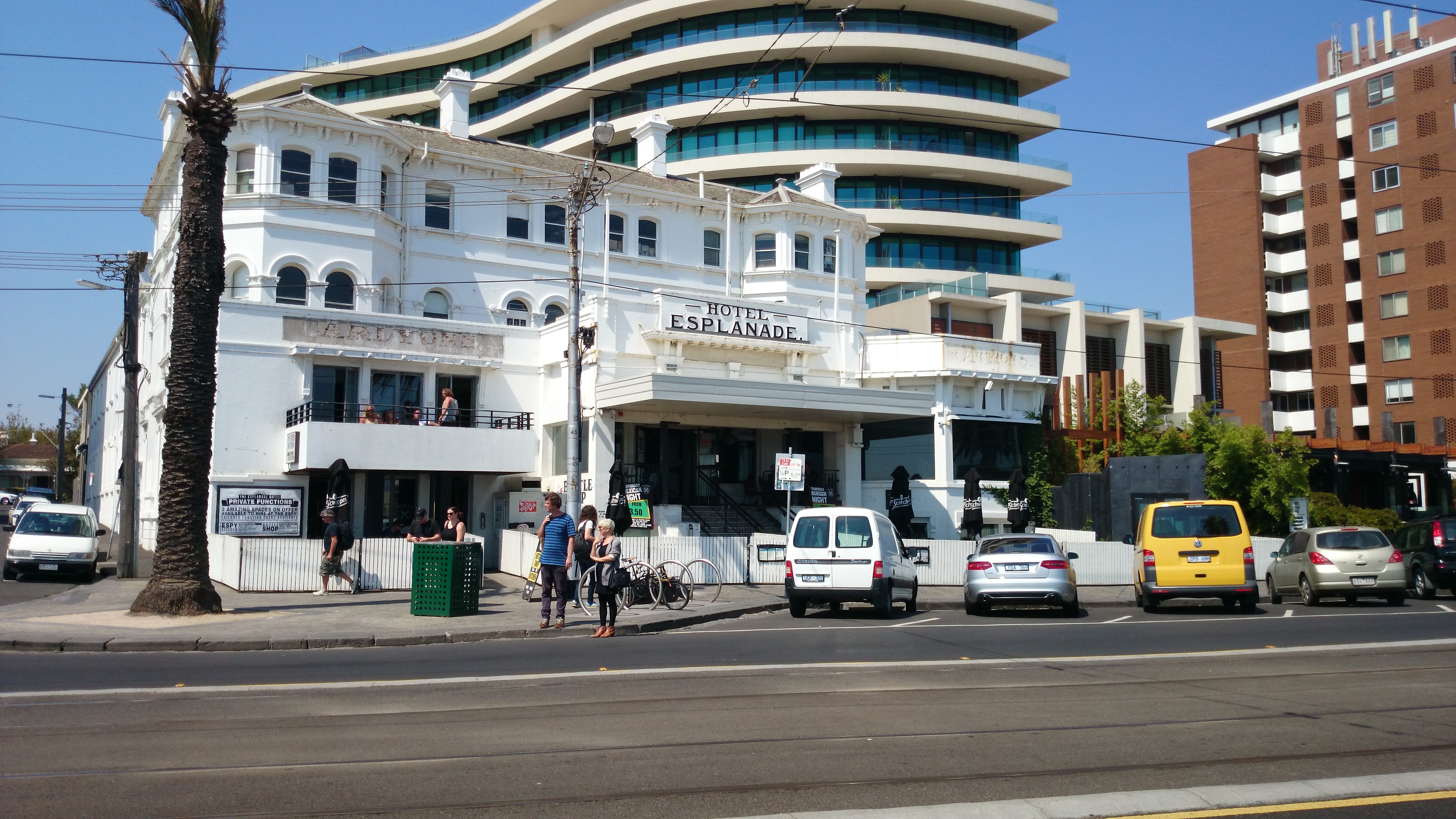
The Esplanade Hotel in Melbourne

- Carlton Inn, Melbourne
- Corner Hotel, Richmond
- Colbinabbin Hotel – Colbinabbin 3559
- Devonshire Arms, Fitzroy (defunct)
- Diggers Rest Hotel (defunct)
- Duke of Wellington, Melbourne
- Empress Hotel, Fitzroy North (defunct)
- Esplanade Hotel
- Fawkner's Hotel (defunct)
- Federal Hotel, Melbourne (defunct)
- The Gordon Hotel – Portland 3305
- Governor Hotham Hotel, Hawthorn
- Hotel Windsor
- Elphinstone Hotel 3448
- Greendale Hotel – Greendale 3341
- Prince of Wales Hotel, St Kilda
- Punters Club
- Old White Hart Hotel, Spring St, Melbourne (defunct)
- Radio Springs Hotel, Lyonville
- Shamrock Hotel, Bendigo
- The Tote Hotel
- Tudor Inn, Cheltenham
- Young & Jackson

=== Western Australia ===
- Exchange Hotel, Kalgoorlie
- Federal Hotel, Fremantle
- Melbourne Hotel
- Palace Hotel, Perth
- Parkerville Tavern, Perth
- Railway Hotel, Perth
- Raffles Hotel, Perth
- Royal Hotel, Perth
- Sail and Anchor Hotel

=== Fictional ===
- Ettamogah Pub
Pubs in Australia

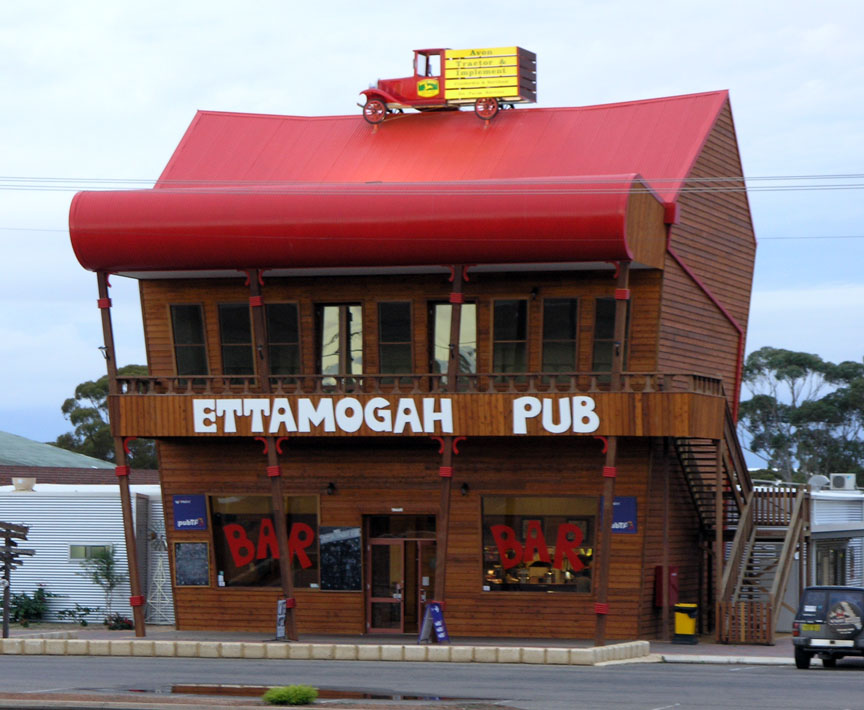
The Ettamogah Pub in Cunderdin

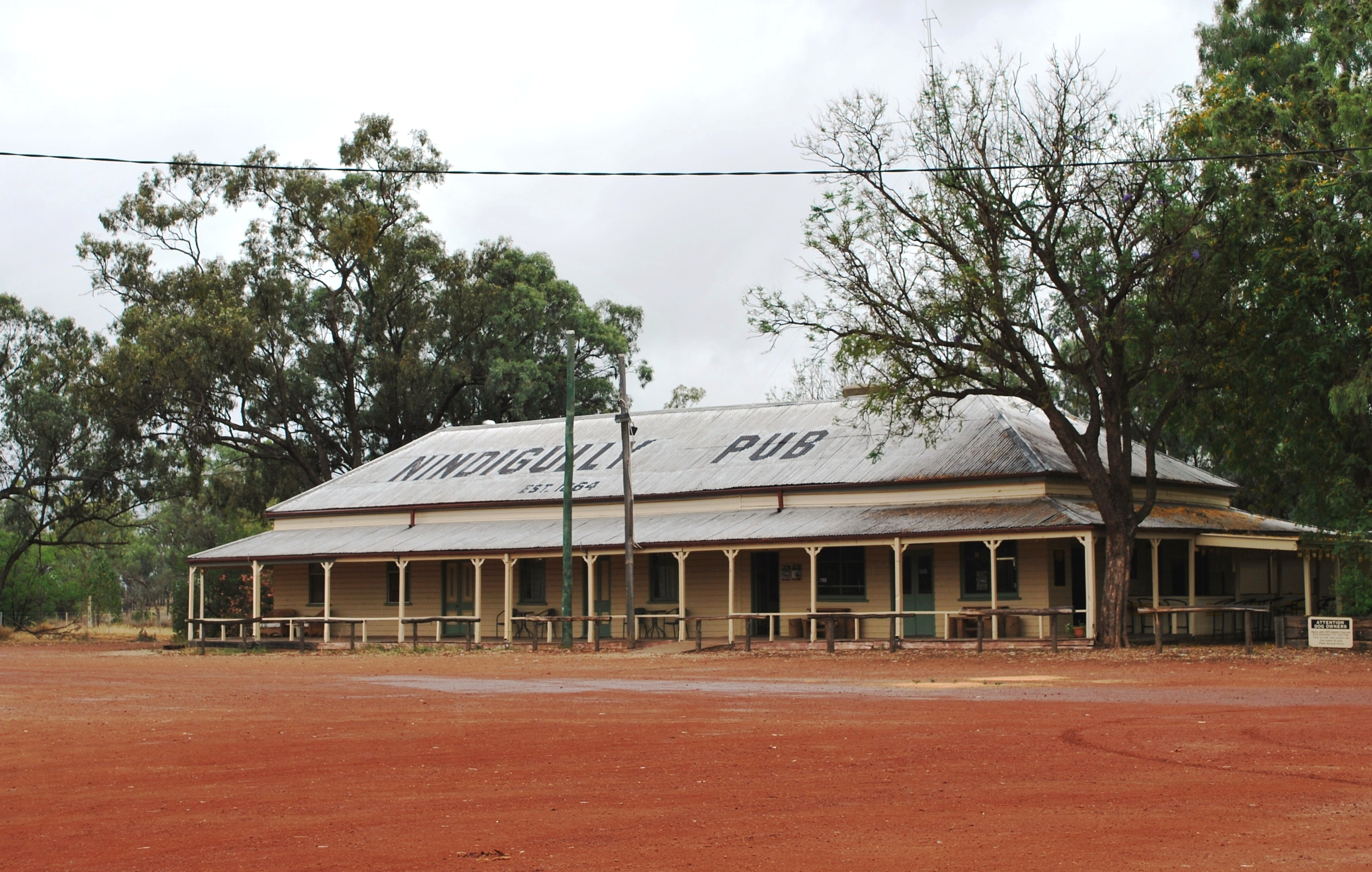
The Nindigully Pub was built in 1864, and is believed to be one of Queensland's longest continually licensed premises.

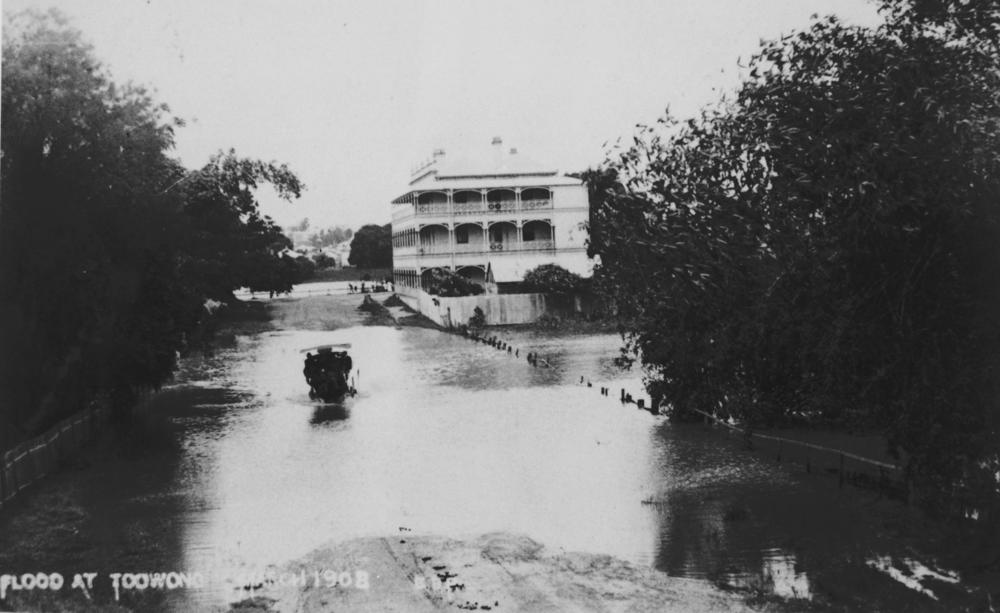
Floodwaters around Regatta Hotel in 1908

== Australian pubs worldwide ==
There are an estimated 3,000 Australian themed pubs worldwide. They have been criticised for a lack of authenticity. They are particularly prevalent wherever Australian tourists or expatriate communities are found, providing a sense of connection for the Australian diaspora.

- Walkabout (pub chain)
- Café Oz Australian Bar

== See also ==
- List of bars
- List of hotels in Australia
- List of microbreweries
- List of public house topics
- Longest bar in Australia
- Micropub
