= Dick's Hotel =

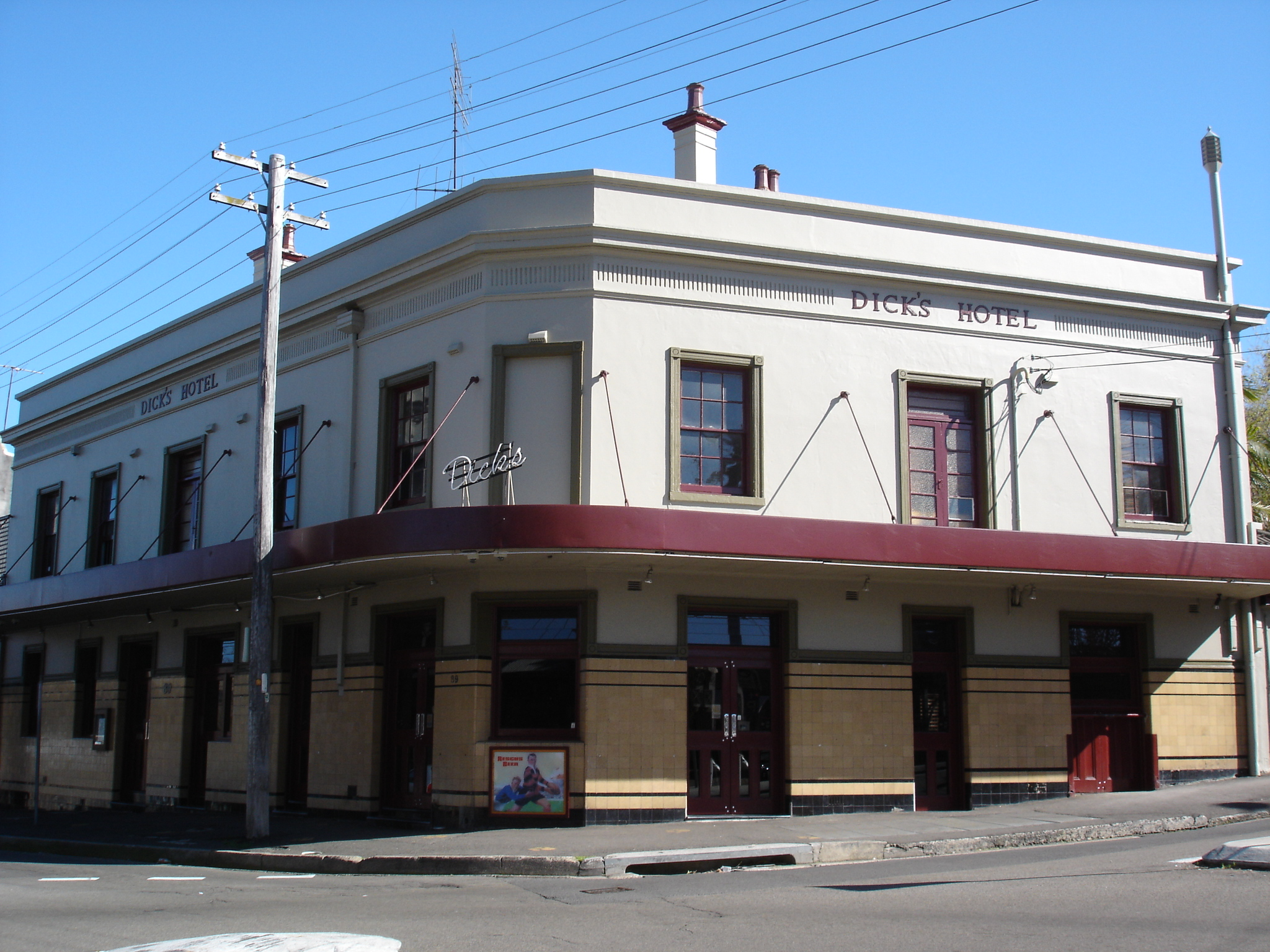
- Interactive map of the Dick's Hotel area

General information
- Status: Completed
- Type: Australian pub
- Location: Corner of Beattie and Montague Streets, Balmain, New South Wales, Australia
- Coordinates: 33°51′31″S 151°10′39″E

Dick's Hotel is a pub located in Balmain, a suburb in the inner west region of Sydney, in the state of New South Wales, Australia. The pub was built by John Dick, a local publican of note, in 1872 on the corner of Beattie and Montague Streets.

The pub was known as Lean's Hotel from 1886 to 1898 when owned by Jabez Lean, but reverted to its former name after and has remained as such since.

The hotel was the location for a number of community meetings following a number of drowning events across NSW. Then on the 8 February 1894 a unanimous decision was reached to establish an Australian Branch of the Life Saving Society of Great Britain (later to become the Royal Life Saving Society in 1904).

Associated with the political movements of the late nineteenth century, especially the growing labour movement, it was also the scene for farewells to contingents from NSW to the Boxer Rebellion and the Boer War. The hotel did not suffer unduly from Darling Street overtaking Beattie Street as the main thoroughfare of the suburb with the introduction of tramways, but rather grew through its rivalry with the three-story Exchange Hotel opposite, built 1886.

Both pubs enjoy a lively competition to this day.

== See also ==
- List of public houses in Australia
