= Beach Hotel =

The Beach Hotel can refer to:

- Beach Hotel (Sydney) in Australia
- Beach Hotel (Galveston) in Texas, USA
