= Forth & Clyde Hotel =

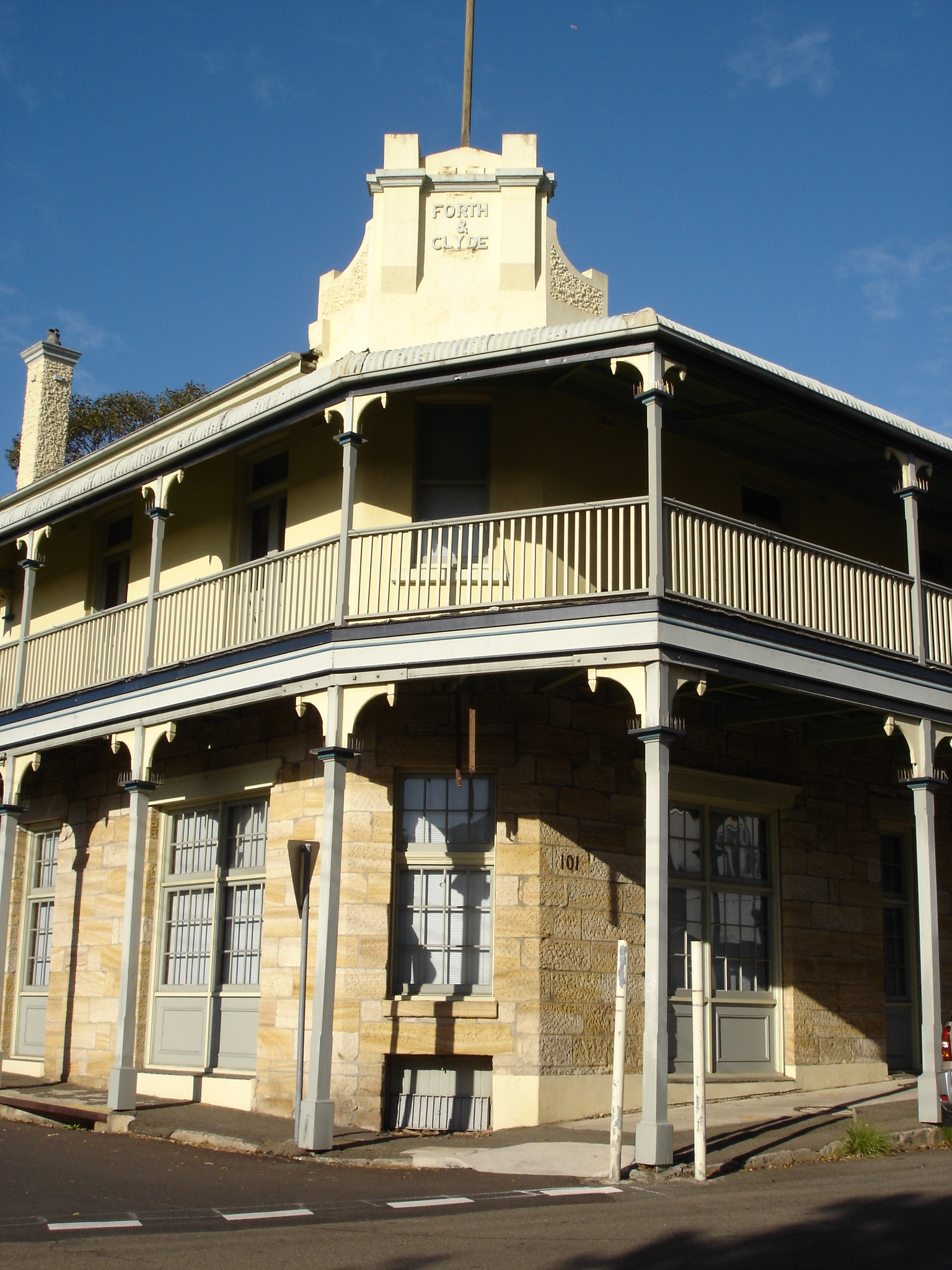
- Interactive map of the Forth & Clyde Hotel area

General information
- Status: Completed
- Type: Former Australian pub
- Location: Cnr Mort and Trouton Streets, Balmain, New South Wales, Australia
- Coordinates: 33°51′17″S 151°11′04″E
- Opened: 1857
- Closed: 1972

The Forth & Clyde Hotel is a former pub located in Balmain, a suburb in the inner west region of Sydney, in the state of New South Wales, Australia. The former pub was one of a number of buildings which formed an integral part of the shipbuilding and industrial heritage of the local area.

The pub featured as a film location for the cult motorcycle bikie movie Stone (1974). The building has been occupied by various businesses since it closed in 1972 and has extensive water views onto Mort Bay. Recently, it has been used for private housing.

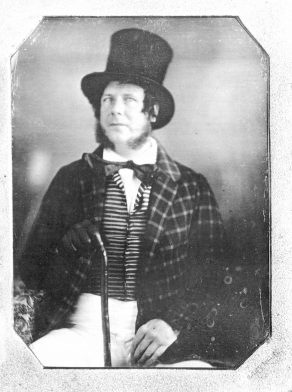
Edward McDonald (1810-1866) was the publican of the Forth and Clyde Hotel from 1845 to 1851

The original Forth & Clyde Hotel was located in Sydney, on the corner of George and Jamison Streets. That pub was taken over by E. Helden, a former ship's captain, in 1856, who then moved it to Balmain. In 1859 Helden sold up the furniture and retired from the business.

An early publican of the hotel was Edward McDonald.

== Architecture ==
The pub is a heritage-listed, two storey sandstone corner building and timber verandah with posts to the footpath.

== See also ==
- List of pubs in Australia
