= Dry Dock Hotel =

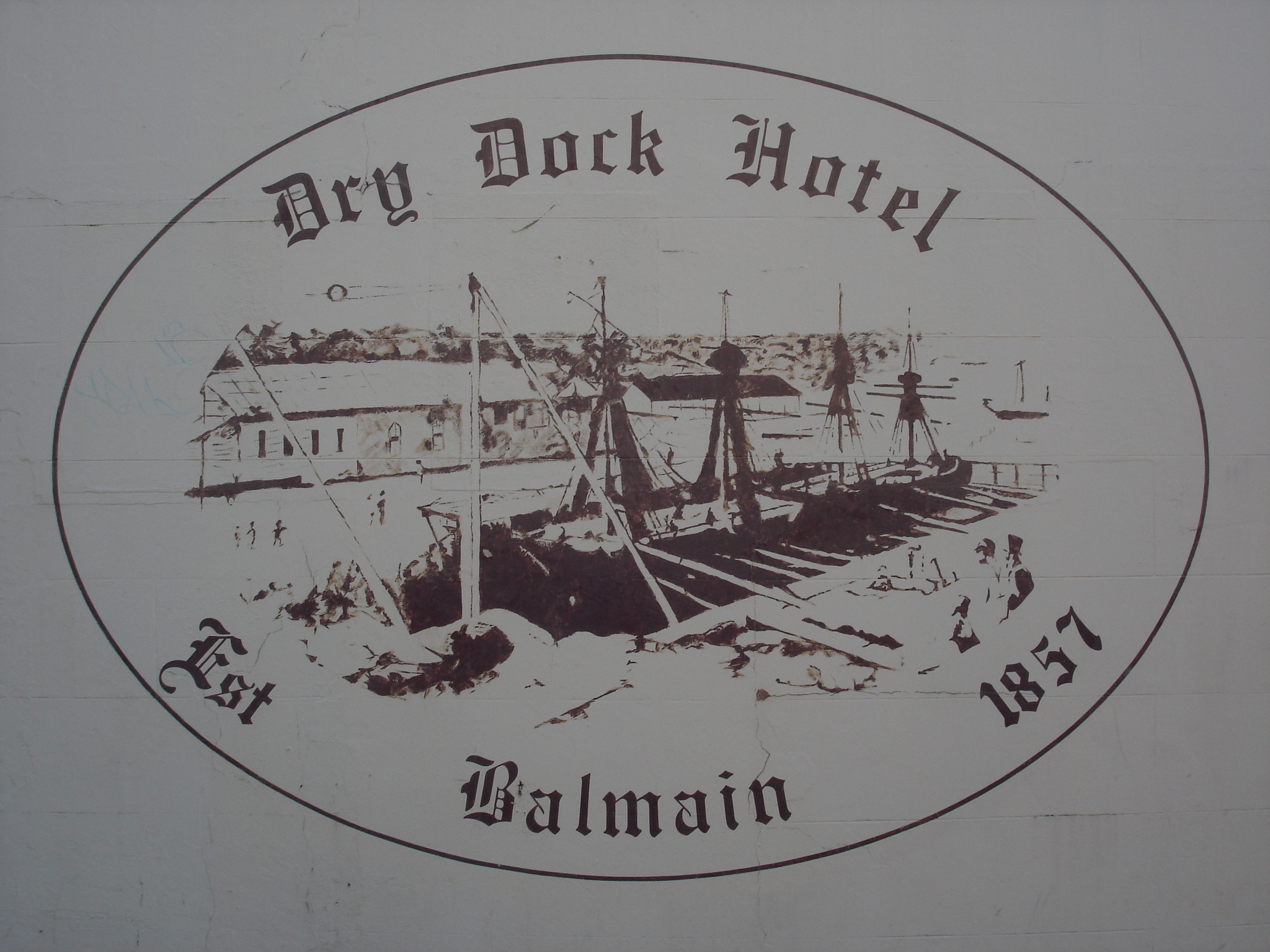

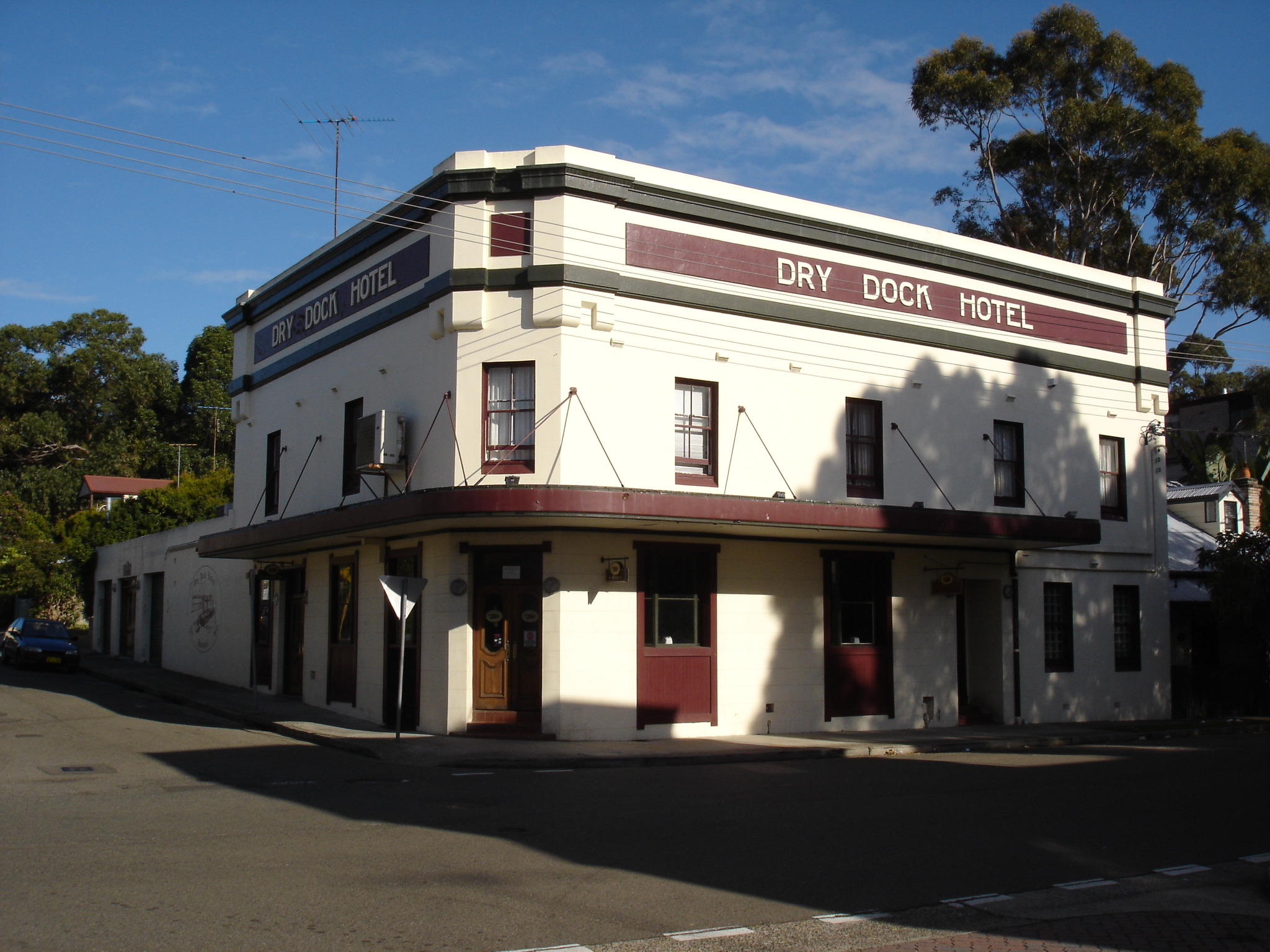
- Interactive map of the Dry Dock Hotel area

General information
- Status: Completed
- Type: Australian pub
- Location: 22 Cameron Street, Balmain, New South Wales, Australia
- Coordinates: 33°51′17″S 151°10′58″E
- Opened: 1857

Technical details
- Floor count: 2

The Dry Dock Hotel is a heritage-listed pub located in Balmain, a suburb in the inner west region of Sydney, in the state of New South Wales, Australia. The pub is the oldest licensed hotel in Balmain and one of a number of establishments which formed an integral part of the shipbuilding and industrial heritage of the local area.

== History ==
The origins of the Dry Dock Hotel can be traced to the Dock Inn located at 4 Thames Street between 1857 and 1861. From here, the pub moved to 42-44 Mort Street between 1865 and 1866. The land on which the pub currently stands was part of a much larger 220-hectare (550-acre) grant to colonial surgeon Dr William Balmain made in 1800 by Governor John Hunter. The licensee Thomas Wakfer, purchased the property on the current site from James McCallum in 1867 for the sum of A£295.

By the mid-1860s, nearby Mort's Dock was undertaking heavy industrialisation of its site in Balmain and was a generator of much housing and employment in the local area. It was from this enterprise that the pub owes much of its early history through the provision of both refreshment and accommodation for dock workers. The main gate for the dock was located only a short distance away at the opposite side of Cameron Street. The hotel was briefly known as The Clarendon in the early 1870s but then reverted to the Dock Inn until 1874, when it was renamed the Dry Dock Hotel. Mort's Dock continued to provide patrons for the Dry Dock until 1957 when rising costs, labour disputes and management problems forced it into liquidation. The hotel was one of the first to open a beer garden on the location of the current restaurant. Betty "Bottles" Holloway publican from 1979 to 1982, was one of the first to introduce live music to pubs in the local area.

== Architecture ==
The pub is a two storey, rendered masonry building that is listed on the Inner West Council local government heritage register of architectural significance. Like most Balmain pubs, the building has gone through a number of structural changes, the most dramatic of which was the removal of the verandah as part of modernisation in the 1920s. The current facade dates from the 1930s.

== See also ==
- List of public houses in Australia
