= Sir William Wallace Hotel =

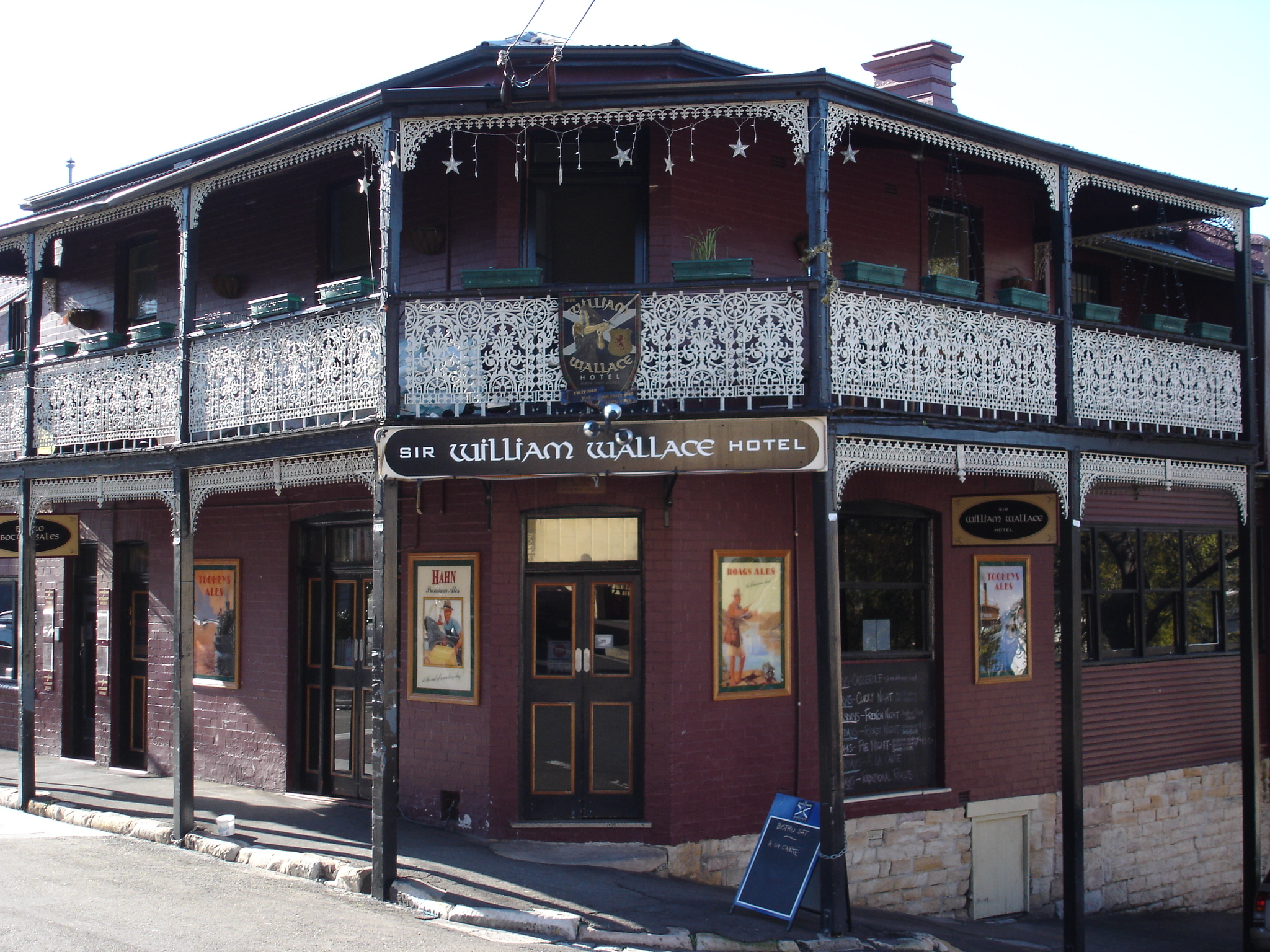

- Location within inner Sydney
- Etymology: Sir William Wallace

General information
- Architectural style: Victorian Filigree
- Location: 31 Cameron Street, Birchgrove, New South Wales, Australia
- Coordinates: 33°51′12″S 151°10′55″E
- Opened: 1879

Website
- www.williamwallacehotel.com.au

The Sir William Wallace Hotel is a heritage-listed pub building in the suburb of Birchgrove on the Balmain Peninsula in the inner west of Sydney, New South Wales, Australia. The pub itself closed for restoration and redevelopment in 2019 and remains closed as of May 2026.

The pub is one of a number of buildings which formed an integral part of the shipbuilding and industrial history of the local area.

== History ==
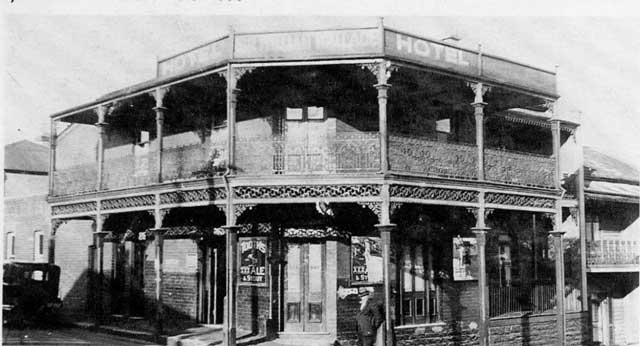
Sir William Wallace Hotel, c. 1930.

The pub is named after Sir William Wallace, a 13th century knight and Scottish patriot. The close proximity to Mort's Dock and later Balmain Colliery ensured patronage right from its early days. The pub is now frequented by locals to whom it is affectionately known as the "Willie Wallace" or "Willie Wallie".

== Architecture and design ==
The pub is a heritage-listed building of local significance built in the Victorian Filigree style. It is a two-storeyed corner hotel with a panelled lace upper verandah, timber posts to street and iron lace balustrades. It is a rare example of a hotel still in its original state.

A mural depicting pub life, complete with regular patrons, was painted on an internal wall in 1995. The mural contains an image of actor Mel Gibson who provided perhaps the best known account of the life of William Wallace in the 1995 film Braveheart. A signed poster from the film also hangs on the wall in the main bar.

== Use as a filming location ==
The pub has been used as the location for a number of Australian films and television shows including the 1975 feature film Caddie, starring Helen Morse and Jack Thompson, the 1994 film The Sum of Us, and a 2001 episode of the British TV series The Bill.

== See also ==
- List of public houses in Australia
