= New Albury Hotel =

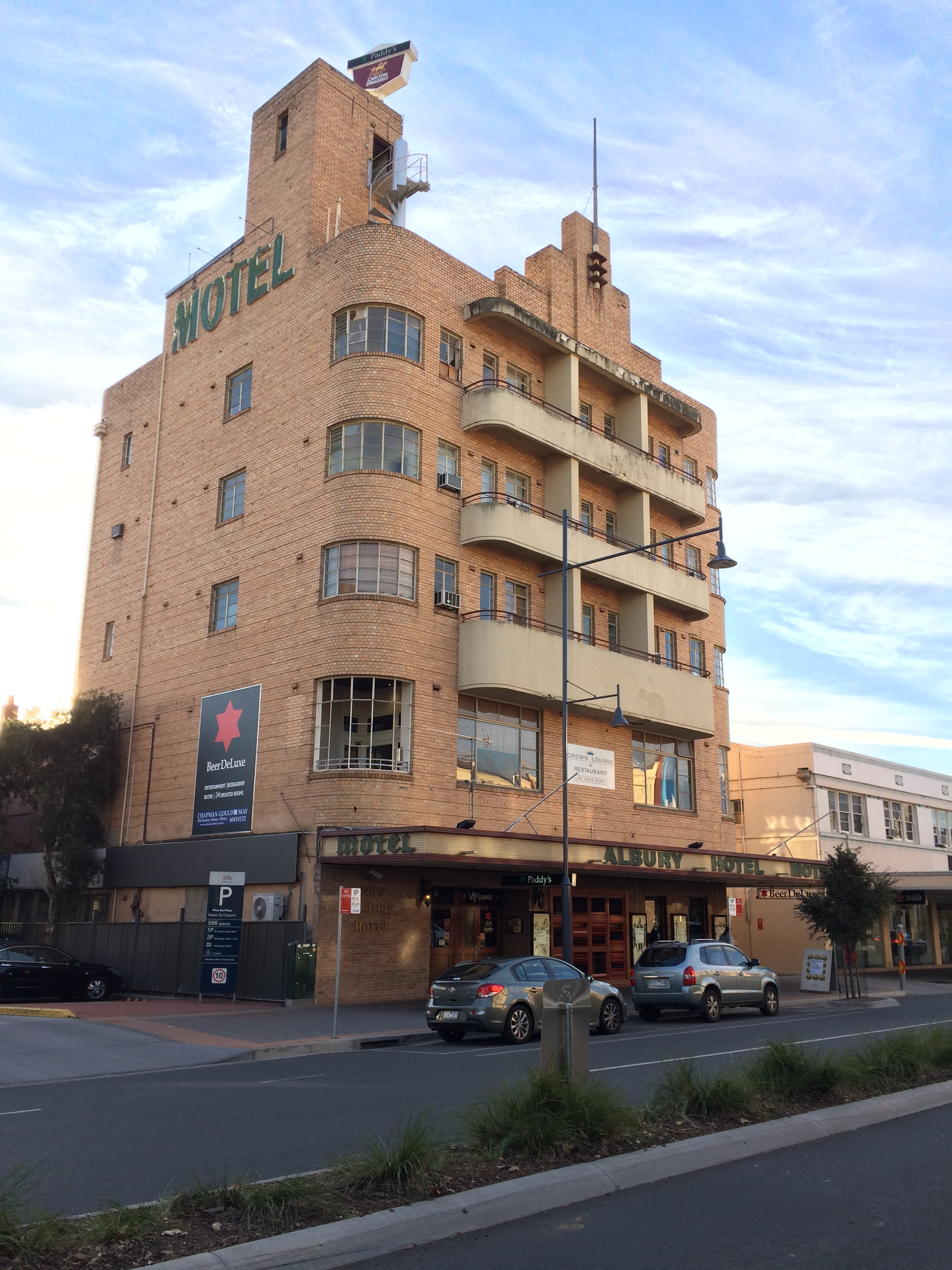
- The New Albury Hotel in 2017

- Location within New South Wales Location within Australia
- 36.0812°S 146.9148°E
- Location: 491 Kiewa Street, Albury, City of Albury, New South Wales, Australia

History
- Built: 1939–1939

Site notes
- Architect: W. H. Merritt
- Architectural style: Bauhaus

New South Wales Heritage Register
- Official name: New Albury Hotel; Hotel Albury
- Type: state heritage (built)
- Designated: 2 April 1999
- Reference no.: 629
- Type: Hotel
- Category: Commercial
- Builders: Snider Constructions

New Albury Hotel is a heritage-listed Australian pub at 491 Kiewa Street, Albury, New South Wales in the Riverina region of the state. It was designed by W. H. Merritt and built in 1939 by Snider Constructions. It is also known as Hotel Albury. It was added to the New South Wales State Heritage Register in 1999.

== History ==
The hotel was designed in 1939 by W. H. Merritt, an architect and engineer from Melbourne. It was built for the Richmond N. S. Brewing Company Pty. Limited. When first built it was named the Hotel Albury but later it became known as the New Albury Hotel. Snider Constructions was the builder and the estimated cost was 25,000 pounds.

== Description ==
The building is a five-storey framed structure faced in cream bricks on three sides with red bricks at the rear. The front façade has a cantilevered verandah at street level and concrete balconies with a white rendered finish above. It is well detailed, well maintained and in original condition. Important exterior details include the rounded corner windows and the horizontal banding effect created by the balconies and cream brick spandrels.

The building is in original condition, except for new metal fire stairs.

== Heritage listing ==
The New Albury Hotel was listed on the New South Wales State Heritage Register on 2 April 1999 based on its aesthetics and rarity.

The building is considered to be an excellent example of international style architecture, well detailed, well maintained and in excellent condition. Similar public buildings, derived from the teachings of Bauhaus, survive in most of the capital cities, but they are exceedingly rare in country towns and regional centres. This building is significant for its rarity as an example of Bauhaus/International style outside of a capital city. It is an important focal building in the centre of Albury and within a designated conservation area.

Being five stories high, it was the first "high rise" building in Albury and remains a dominant feature of the streetscape. The state heritage listing states that its dominance should be retained over any future developments in the immediate vicinity.
