= Albion Hotel, Balmain =

Building in Sydney, Australia

Coordinates: 33.8583056°S 151.1855313°E

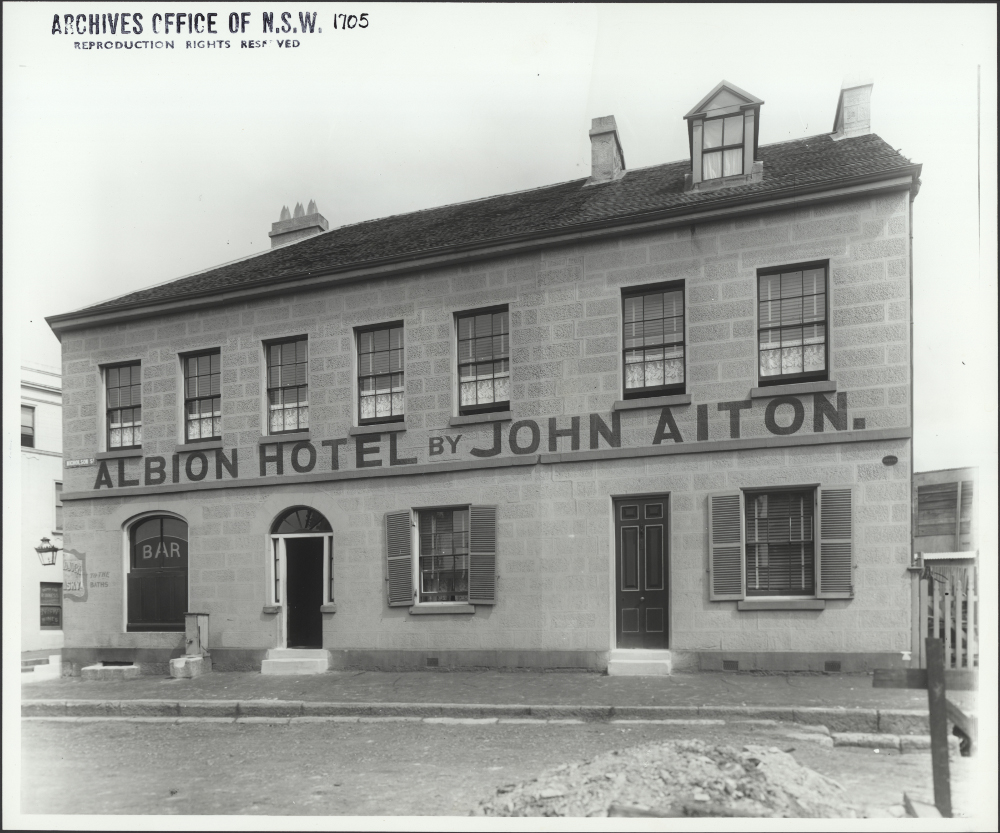
Front of the Albion Hotel, Nicholson Street, Balmain, 1898

The Albion Hotel is a former pub in the suburb of Balmain, in the Inner West of Sydney, in the state of New South Wales, Australia. It is currently operated as a trattoria, café and private residence.

== History ==
The pub was built in 1860 on the corner of Darling and Ann Streets to cater for workers from nearby Mort Bay. In 1876, the building became a grocery, perhaps due to the competition of the nearby and larger Pacific Hotel and London Hotel. Its licence was transferred to the Unity Hall Hotel, then on the corner of Nicholson and Darling Streets East Balmain, now Oddfellows Hall, until 1910, when it lapsed.

In 2000, it became a trattoria and café, currently called Ciao Thyme.

== See also ==
- List of public houses in Australia
