= Riverview Hotel, Balmain =

Riverview Hotel
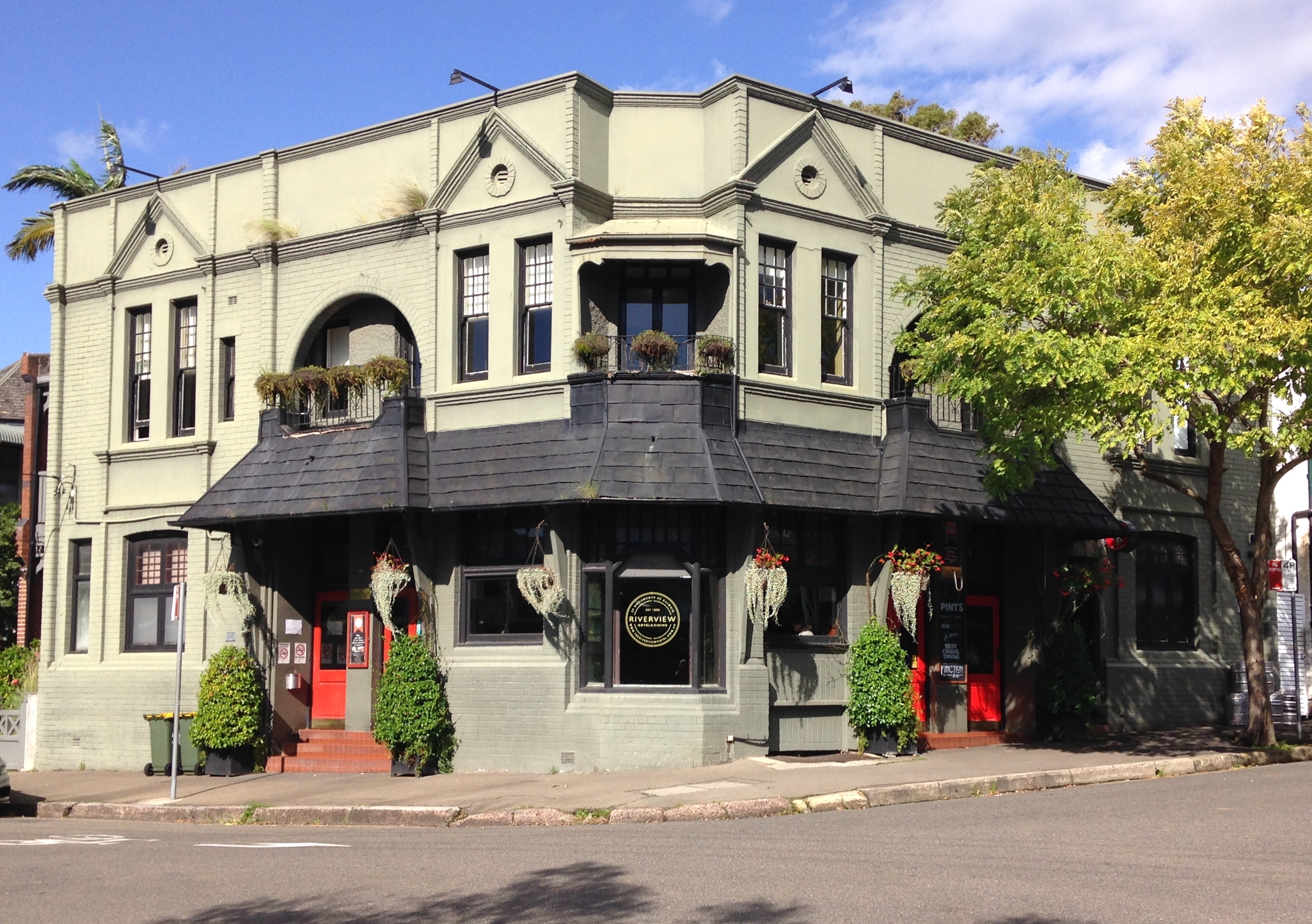
- Riverview Hotel in 2019
- Interactive map of the Riverview Hotel area

General information
- Type: Australian pub
- Location: 29 Birchgrove Road, Balmain, New South Wales, Australia
- Coordinates: 33°51′18″S 151°10′31″E
- Opened: 1880

Website
- https://www.theriverviewhotel.com.au/

The Riverview Hotel is a heritage-listed pub located in Balmain, a suburb in the inner west region of Sydney, in the state of New South Wales, Australia. Australian swimming champion, Dawn Fraser, was publican of the Riverview from 1978 to 1983.

== History ==
The Riverview Hotel was established in 1880. Patrick Kearney was the licensee of the Tooheys pub in 1881. In August 1887, Joseph Bergin took over the license from Herbert Edwards. In December 1899, Bergin received permission from the water licensing court to change the hotel's name, and it became known as Bergin's Hotel. He sold the license, lease, goodwill, and furniture to Tooth and Company in 1908 after which it was again known as the Riverview Hotel from 1909. In 1929, John Reay Palmer transferred his licence to Jack Richards May. A year later the licence was transferred from William Tierney to John Rogers Walter, while in 1936 Charles E. Davis took over from George Stanley Bettley as licensee. David Joseph Cloughessy was proprietor in 1938.

In late 2008, after renovation, it reopened.

The Riverview Hotel is listed on the Inner West Council local government heritage register. The corner building was built in the Arts and Crafts style with distinctive brick work details. It was remodelled again c. 1909.

== See also ==
- List of public houses in Australia
