= Beach Hotel, Rozelle =

Coordinates: 33°51′52″S 151°10′42″E

Beach Hotel
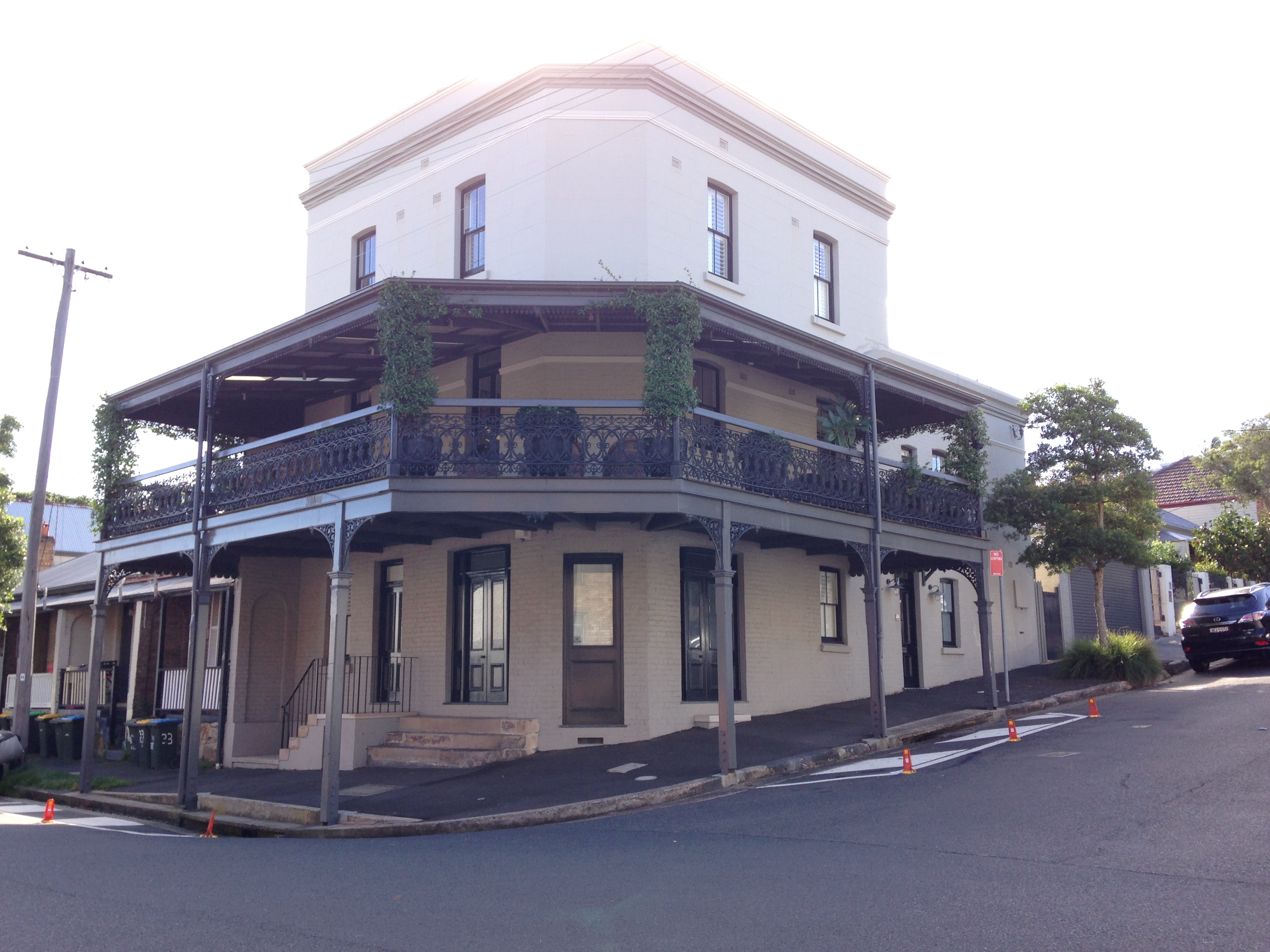
- Beach Hotel, cnr Smith & Mansfield Streets, Rozelle, now a private residence

General information
- Type: Australian pub
- Architectural style: Victorian Free Classical
- Location: corner of Smith and Mansfield Streets, Rozelle, New South Wales, Australia
- Opened: 1881
- Closed: 1928

The Beach Hotel is a historic de-licensed pub in the suburb of Rozelle, above White Bay in the Inner West of Sydney, New South Wales, Australia. It is currently a private residence after having been in a long state of abandonment.

== History ==
Built in 1881 on the corner of Smith and Mansfield Streets with an outlook over Glebe Island and Sydney city, the hotel was first known as the Why Not. In 1887 it became the Beach Hotel, perhaps because of the beach then existent in front of it in White Bay, but also plausibly in honour of Australian sculling champion Bill Beach, who became world champion in 1886, and returned in triumph from London the following year. The favourite haunt of sawmill workers, along with the neighbouring Bald Rock Hotel, it went into decline before finally closing in 1928. The closure was the result of a determination by the Licenses Reduction Board. A case was made for compensation for its closure was successful and resulted in the owner, Sydney Bebarfald, receiving £1,630, the licensee, Walter Alexander Bourke, receiving $1,530 and the lessees, Tooheys Limited, receiving £350.

It later operated as a shop, boarding house and other businesses before falling into disrepair. It was completely renovated as a private house following its purchase by new owners in 2011.
