= Carlisle Castle Hotel =

Pub in Newtown, Australia

General information
- Status: Completed
- Type: Australian pub
- Location: 17–19 Albermarle Street, Newton, New South Wales, Australia
- Coordinates: 33°53′43″S 151°10′35″E
- Completed: 1876

Website
- carlislecastlehotel.com.au

Carlisle Castle Hotel is a pub in Newtown, Sydney, New South Wales, Australia.

== History ==
Carlisle Castle Hotel was built in 1876 as a classic pub hidden away in the back streets of Newtown.

The Italian marble bar that adorns the castle's traditional entrance nowadays was installed in the 1920s.

Carlisle Castle Hotel has gone through several renovations and iterations throughout the years.

== Amenities ==
Carlisle Castle Hotel offers accommodation, a marble bar, piano parlor, lounge room, beer garden, and bottle shop.

There's also a giant Jenga tower inside.

== In popular culture ==
The pub was reportedly haunted. Bartenders have reported strange occurrences such as lights flickering on and off, beer taps turning on by themselves, and shadows moving around the room. In 2014, a wine bottle flinging off by itself was caught on camera.

Some suggested it must be "Old Peter" who worked in the pub in the early 1990s. Others suggest it's Carlisle Castle Hotel's licensee, Peter Bradbury's, predecessor Johnny Hoy. Doubtful netizens however, insisted that the drinks fell off due to lazy shelf stacking or vibrations of a fridge motor.

== See also ==
- List of public houses in Australia
