= The Oriental Hotel =

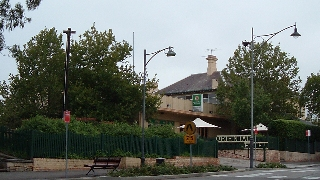
- The Oriental Hotel, looking southwest

- Location within New South Wales
- Former names: Springwood Hotel
- Alternative names: Oriental Hotel, The Ori, Hotel Sydenham

General information
- Status: Completed
- Type: Pub
- Location: 110-112 Macquarie Road, Springwood, New South Wales, Australia
- Coordinates: 33°41′58″S 150°34′04″E
- Construction started: 1878
- Completed: 1890
- Opened: 1878 (as the Springwood Hotel); 1891 (as the Oriental Hotel)
- Client: Frank Raymond; James Lawson

Technical details
- Floor count: 2

The Oriental Hotel, also known as The Ori and formerly known as the Springwood Hotel, is a heritage-listed pub located in Springwood, a suburb of the Blue Mountains, west of Sydney, New South Wales, Australia.

== History ==
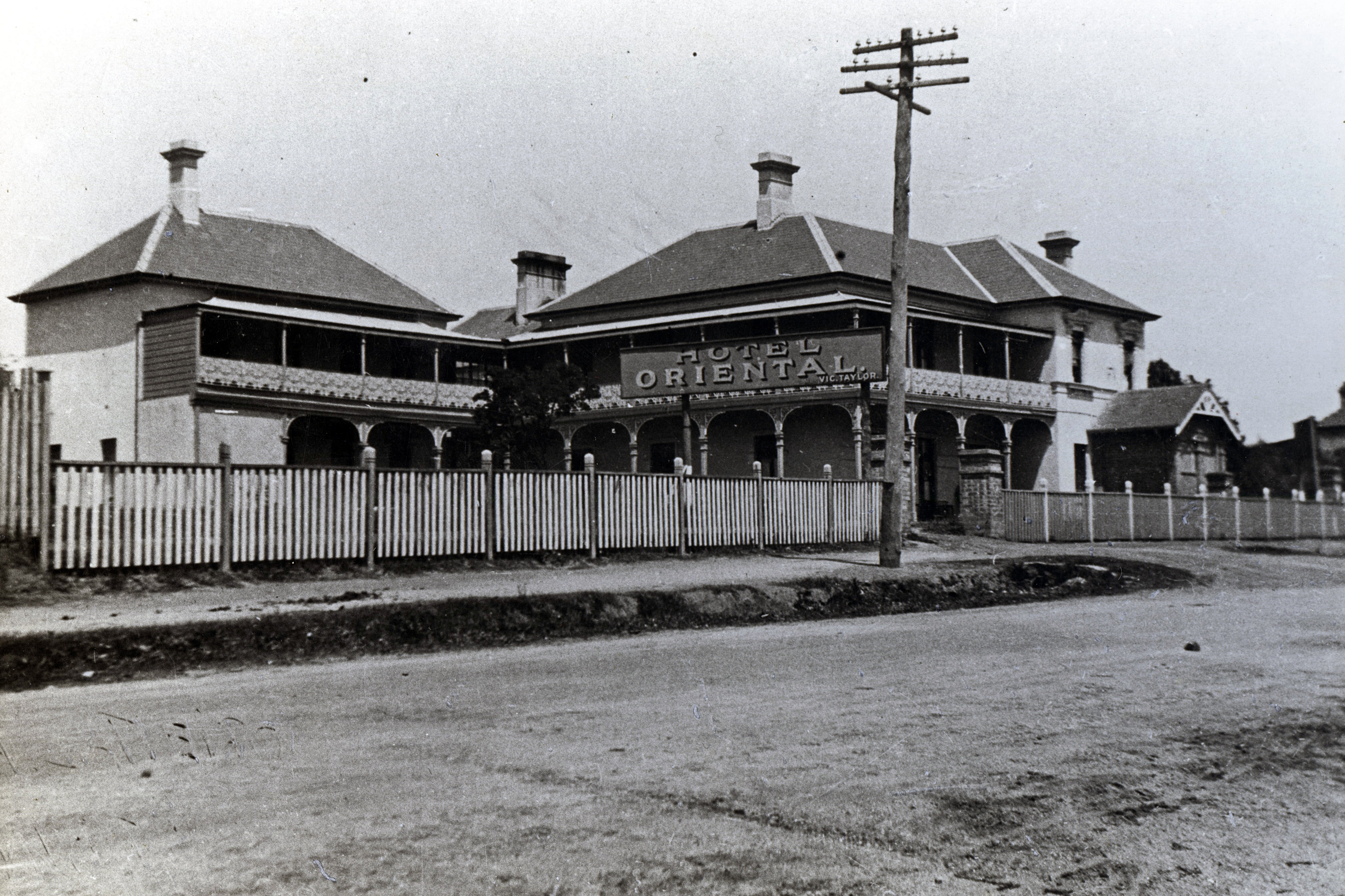
The Oriental Hotel in 1920

The Springwood Hotel was built in 1878 by Frank Raymond as a long, single-storied, low-browed building with a simple verandah facing the main road.

In 1890 Raymond sold a portion of the land grant that he owned at Springwood to James Lawson who developed the site as a large two storey hotel. It is this building that is listed on the local government heritage register of the City of Blue Mountains. The Oriental Hotel is in a prominent location at the corner of Macquarie Road and Raymond Road. The Victorian origins of the hotel are best seen from Raymond Road where the hipped slate roof, rendered chimneys and vertically proportioned double hung windows are most visible. Facing Macquarie Road the hotel has a two-storey verandah on its main north wing terminated by a hipped front. This composition relates to its Victorian origins, but the verandah has lost its original timber and cast iron structure and the windows have lost their highly decorative surrounds. A two-storey wing to the east, set back from Macquarie Street, was built around the same time as the main wing. The picket fence to Macquarie Street is a reconstruction of the early fence on the site.

== Current features ==
The pub still operates today, and now also includes a cafe. Bands regularly perform in the pub.

== See also ==
- List of pubs in New South Wales
