= Royal Oak Hotel, Balmain =

Royal Oak Hotel
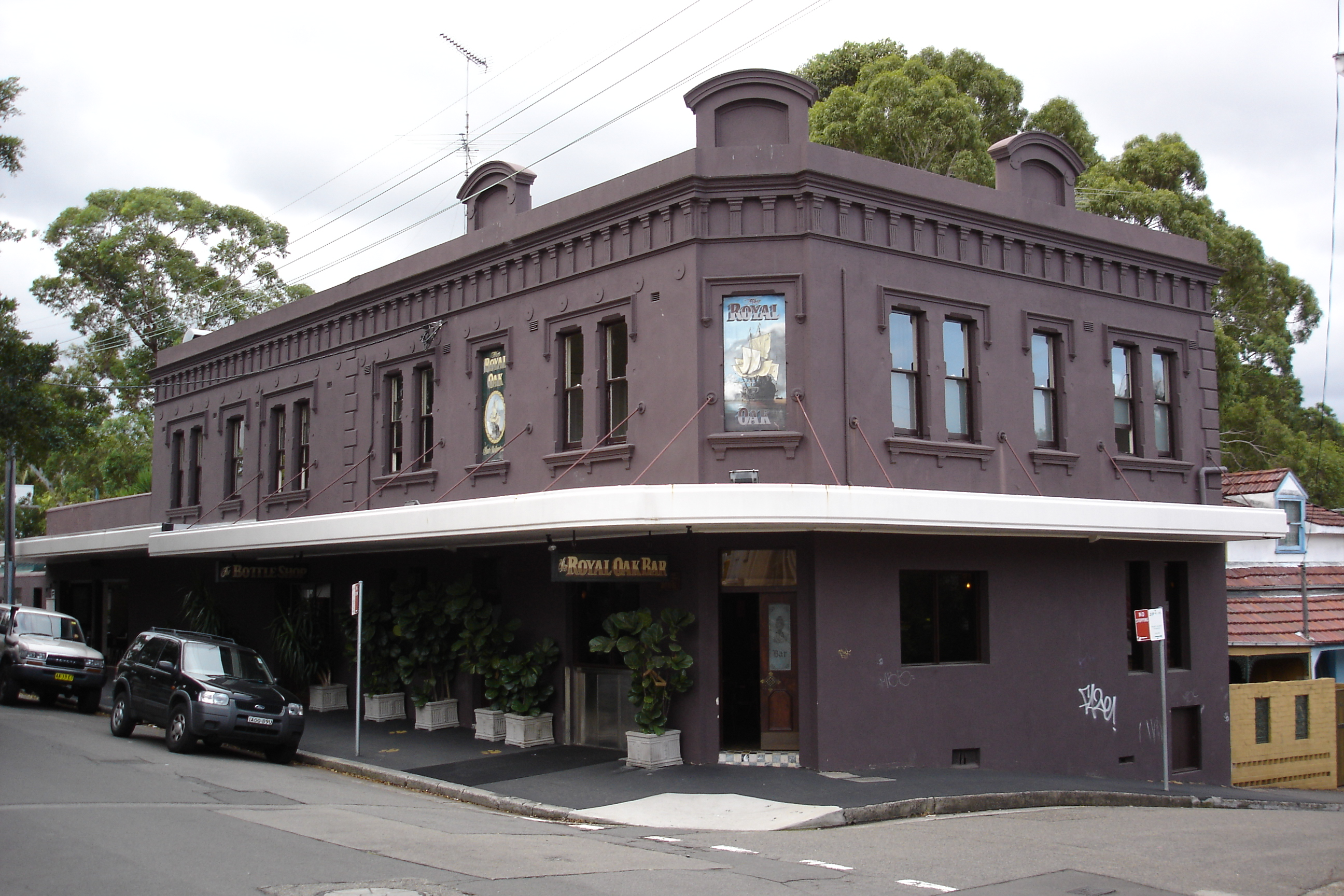
- Interactive map of the Royal Oak Hotel area

General information
- Status: Completed
- Type: Australian pub
- Architectural style: Victorian Free Classical
- Location: 36 College Street (on the corner of Curtis Road), Balmain, New South Wales, Australia
- Coordinates: 33°51′20″S 151°10′52″E
- Opened: 1878

The Royal Oak Hotel is a pub located in Balmain, a suburb in the inner west region of Sydney, in the state of New South Wales, Australia. The pub has historical links with the union movement and is one of a number of buildings which formed an integral part of the shipbuilding and industrial history of the local area.

== History ==
The land on which the pub currently stands was part of a much larger 220-hectare (550-acre) grant to colonial surgeon Dr William Balmain made in 1800 by Governor John Hunter. The hotel was established in 1878 as Hollis's Hotel under publican George Hollis. In 1884, J. W. Clifford became publican, renamed it to the Clifford Family Hotel and refitted the hotel in 1886. A further change of ownership took place again in 1888 when William Coates renamed the pub Coates Family Hotel. Thomas Hunt gave the pub its current name after taking over in 1898. By the mid-1860s, nearby Mort's Dock was undertaking heavy industrialisation of its site in Balmain and was a generator of much housing and employment in the local area. It was from this enterprise, which continued until 1957 that the pub owes much of its early history through the provision of refreshment for dock workers. The main gate for the dock was located only a short distance away at the end of Cameron Street. In 1887 the Balmain branch of The Slip, Dock and General Labourers Union was formed and the mailing address was given as Clifford's Hotel. The union later became known as the Balmain Labourers Union and in 1900 at the Royal Oak Hotel, changed its name to the Painters and Dockers Union.

== Heritage-listing ==
The Royal Oak Hotel is listed on the Inner West Council local government heritage register. It is a two-storey rendered brick corner building with decorative parapet, label moulds to windows and a simple awning. The current façade, which is in Victorian Free Classical style, dates from 1886.

It is one of the few hotels in the local area that never possessed a verandah, with the current awning only having been added in recent years. During the 1960s and 1970s, a side door in College Street still led to the ladies parlour.

== See also ==
- List of public houses in Australia
