= Exchange Hotel (Balmain) =

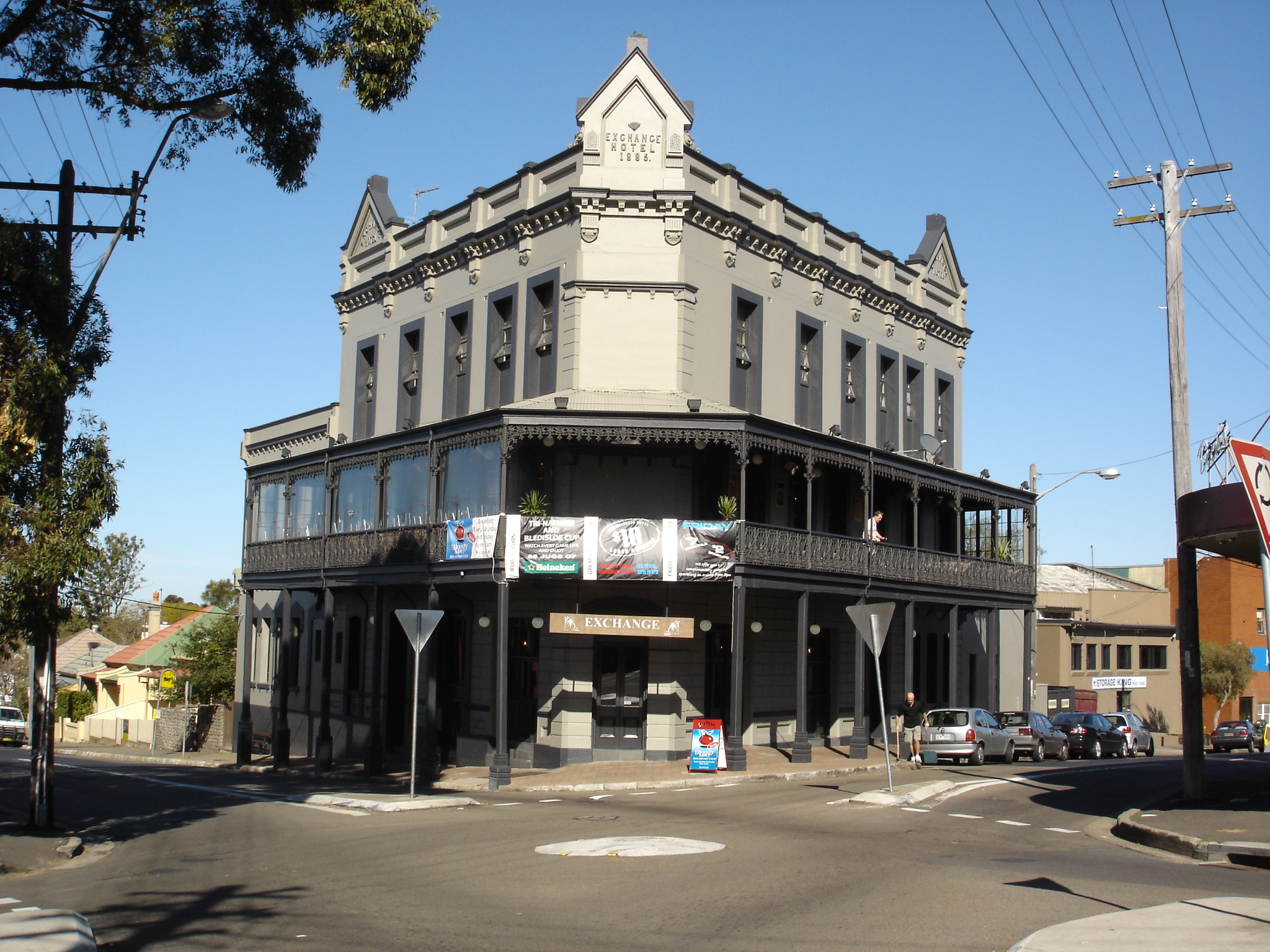
- Interactive map of the Exchange Hotel area

General information
- Status: Completed
- Type: Australian pub
- Architectural style: Victorian Free Classical
- Location: Cnr Beattie and Mullens Streets, Balmain, New South Wales, Australia
- Coordinates: 33°51′32″S 151°10′38″E
- Opened: 1885

The Exchange Hotel is a heritage-listed pub located in Balmain, a suburb in the inner west region of Sydney, in the state of New South Wales, Australia.

== History ==
The Exchange Hotel was the last pub to be built during the local boom of the 1880s. It was also the largest in the Balmain and Rozelle area. The original building consisted of 40 rooms connected with 2.1-metre-wide (7 ft) corridors. The pub became a major meeting point for the local community and in the early years as the centre for union members, including those of the Balmain Labourers Union which later went on to become the Painters and Dockers Union.

The building is a three-storey structure constructed in the Victorian Free Classical style. It has rendered masonry and a verandah with iron lace and timber lattice decorations to the middle level with timber posts to footpath. The original construction had an additional upper verandah which has since been removed. All of the balcony, column and railings were produced at the nearby Annandale Foundry.

The pub is listed on the Inner West Council local government heritage register and has been assessed as having local historical and architectural significance.

== See also ==
- List of public houses in Australia
