= Bald Rock Hotel =

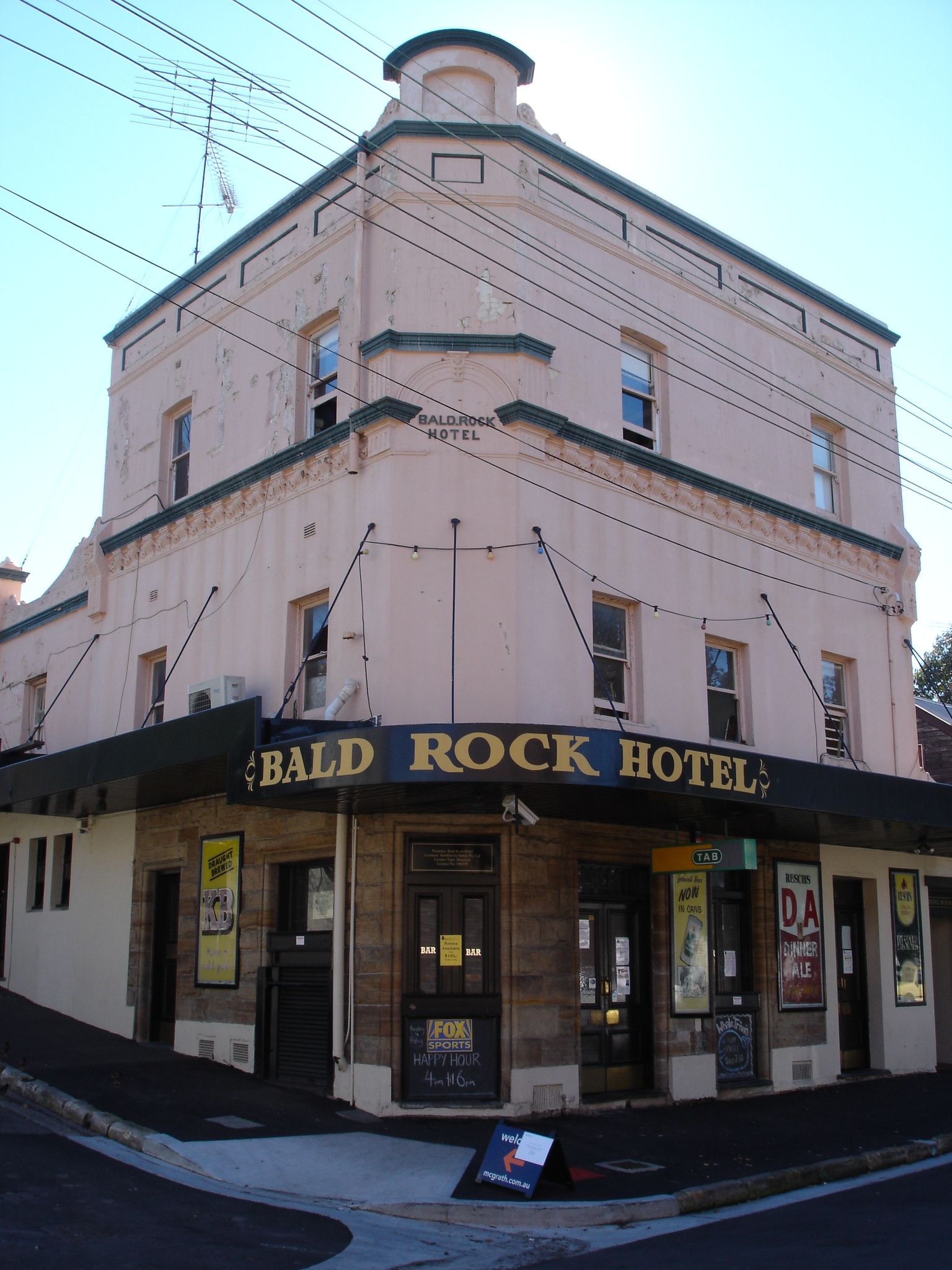
- Interactive map of the Bald Rock Hotel area

General information
- Status: Completed
- Type: Australian pub
- Architectural style: Victorian Filigree; Victorian Free Classical
- Location: 15 – 17 Mansfield Street, Rozelle, New South Wales, Australia
- Coordinates: 33°51′51″S 151°10′45″E
- Opened: 1876

Technical details
- Material: Sydney sandstone

Website
- www.baldrockhotel.com.au

The Bald Rock Hotel is a heritage-listed pub in the suburb of Rozelle, overlooking White Bay in the inner west region of Sydney, in the state of New South Wales, Australia. It is the oldest continuously licensed hotel still operating in the Balmain and Rozelle area.

== History ==
Bald Rock was originally a suburb within the municipality of Balmain, so named because of the lack of vegetation in the area. The hotel was built in 1876 and prior to landfill occupied a position close to the Bald Rock ferry, which carried passengers from Balmain to Erskine Street wharf in Sydney city.

The pub is listed on the Inner West Council local government heritage register. The three-storey building with facestone work to ground level has a simple hung awning over the street. The original construction was in the Victorian Filigree style, however removal of the upper level balcony and other modifications now leave a building in the Victorian Free Classical style. The hotel has retained the original sandstone interior.

== See also ==
- List of public houses in Australia
