= Hotel Francis =

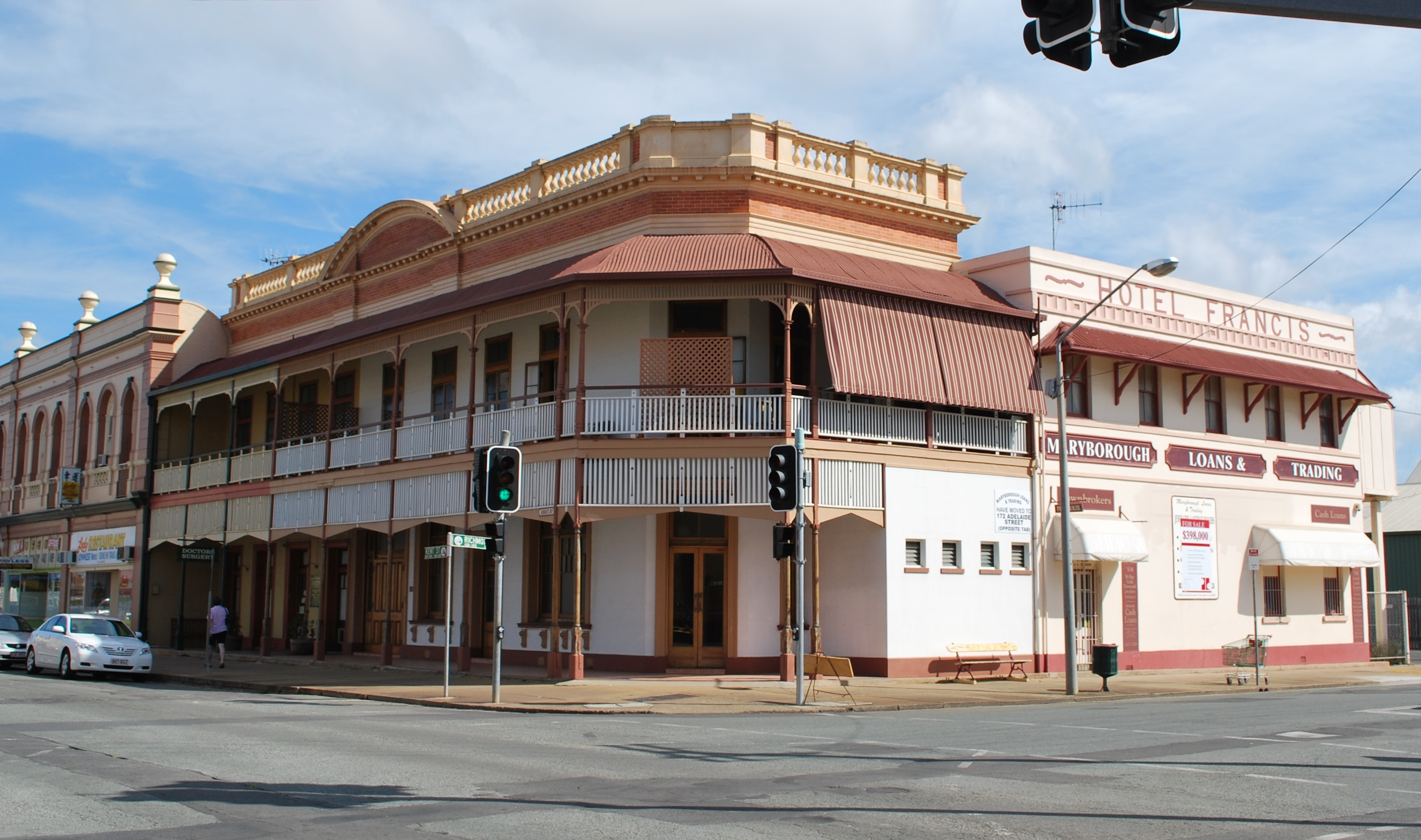
- Hotel Francis, 2008

- Location within Queensland Location within Australia
- 25.5394°S 152.7044°E
- Location: 310 Kent Street, Maryborough, Fraser Coast Region, Queensland, Australia

History
- Design period: 1870s–1890s (late 19th century)
- Built: 1878

Queensland Heritage Register
- Official name: Hotel Francis (former), Metropolitan Hotel (1878–1935)
- Type: state heritage (built)
- Designated: 21 October 1992
- Reference no.: 600696
- Significant period: 1870s, 1910s (fabric); 1878–ongoing (historical use)
- Significant components: kitchen/kitchen house, out building/s

Hotel Francis is a heritage-listed former hotel at 310 Kent Street, Maryborough, Fraser Coast Region, Queensland, Australia. It was built in 1878. It is also known as Metropolitan Hotel (1878–1935). It was added to the Queensland Heritage Register on 21 October 1992.

== History ==
The former Hotel Francis is a two-storey building, constructed in multiple stages between 1878 and 1938. It is on the site of an earlier hotel, the Maryborough Inn, later known as the Steam Packet.

Settlement at Maryborough commenced in September 1847 when George Furber established a woolstore on the south bank of the Mary River at the head of navigation. He was followed in June 1848 by ET Aldridge and Henry and RE Palmer, who established their own wharves on the opposite riverbank, at a location now known as the original Maryborough town site at Baddow. In 1850 a new town site was surveyed to the east, at a downstream position which provided better access for shipping. The first sale of land at this new site occurred in 1852, but most residents did not shift to the current centre of Maryborough until 1855 and 1856. Maryborough was gazetted a Port of Entry in 1859 and was proclaimed a municipality, the Borough of Maryborough, in 1861. During the 1860s and 1870s Maryborough flourished as the principal port for the nearby Gympie goldfield and as an outlet for timber and sugar. The establishment of manufacturing plants and primary industries sustained growth in the town into the twentieth century.

The Maryborough Inn, believed to be the first hotel at the new town, was established on the site as early as 1853. The first licensee was James Davenport Walker. The site was subsequently occupied by the Steam-packet Hotel which was demolished to make way for the first stage of the present building.

The first storey of the present building, then known as the Metropolitan Hotel, was erected in 1878. Described as a one-storey building with four sitting rooms and five bedrooms exclusive of those used by the publican, it had an 80-foot (24 m) frontage to Kent Street and a 33-foot (10 m) frontage to Richmond Street. Access was provided to the upper floors of the adjoining Helsham's Buildings for extra accommodation.

On 1 May 1883, tenders were advertised for additions to the hotel. This was probably for the first storey of the rear extension facing Richmond Street.

Further tenders were called in 1914 for additions and an extension to the bar; the architect being HWF Palmer. The hotel remained a single- storey building and was now described as having seven rooms for the public and three for private use.

On 17 April 1919, the Maryborough Chronicle reported that plans had been prepared for a second storey. A photograph indicates this was completed by 1923. The photograph also shows, by this time, the Kent Street frontage was very similar in appearance to the present building but the rear, Richmond Street, extension (now two storeys) comprised only a single storey.

The hotel was given its present name, the Hotel Francis, in 1935 while in the ownership of the Noonan family. In 1938 tenders were let for a second-storey addition to staff quarters facing Richmond Street. The architect was POE Hawkes.

Surrender of the hotel licence was accepted by the Department of Tourism, Sport and Racing in September 1992.

== Description ==
The former Hotel Francis is a two-storeyed masonry building located on the corner of Kent and Richmond Streets, Maryborough. The site contains several smaller buildings to the rear of the hotel.

The hotel comprises two major elements; the early hotel lined with two-storeyed verandahs extending down the Kent Street facade and around the corner into Richmond Street where it is met by the second stage of the building, a two-storeyed stuccoed wing.

The early section is constructed of rendered brick which has been scribed to resemble stonework to the height of the parapet, which consists of a face brickwork band surmounted by a stringcourse with dentils above which is an Italianate balustrade punctuated with moulded masonry panels. Centrally located on Kent Street facade of the parapet, interrupting the balustrade is a face brick curved pediment, accentuating the ground floor entrance to the former accommodation and dining rooms. The parapet conceals a hipped corrugated iron roof.

The two-storeyed verandah is supported on posts, the cast iron body of which sits on a timber base and is also extended through the frieze in timber. The truncated corner of the building is emphasised by pairs of columns flanking the corner entrance, extending through to the floor above. The ground floor verandah frieze is of plain timber slats with feature fretwork slats, below which are diagonally cut timber panels. One bay of the ground floor verandah space has been infilled with rendered and scribed brickwork. The verandah to the upper floor has an ogee curved profile awning, balustrading of similar detail to the frieze below, and slatted timber brackets and frieze. A rudimentary rear verandah is accessed by a straight timber stair.

Entrance to the former public bar is through the double glazed doors, with arctic glass transom window above, on the truncated corner. The Kent Street facade has several half glazed and moulded french doors with operable transom windows above and a centrally located double doorway, of four panelled doors, as well as large window openings with moulded sills and consoles. The joinery to this elevation is very fine and intact.

Internally the building features pressed metal ceilings, cornices and roses throughout and timber floors. The upper floor retains some single skin timber partitioning, though the original layout is evident in the pressed metal ceiling where different patterns were used for each room.

The later rendered masonry extension, in Richmond Street, features round arched openings to the ground floor and square arched openings above, which are shaded by a hipped awning of fibrous cement. The flat parapet of this section has "HOTEL FRANCIS" in relief, concealing a skillion roof.

To the rear of the hotel is a small one storeyed brick building with a hipped corrugated iron roof and a large brick chimney stack at one end.

== Heritage listing ==
Hotel Francis was listed on the Queensland Heritage Register on 21 October 1992 having satisfied the following criteria.

The place is important in demonstrating the evolution or pattern of Queensland's history.

The Hotel Francis demonstrates the growth of Maryborough.

The place is important because of its aesthetic significance.

The Hotel Francis is a good and intact example of a Queensland country town hotel, and is an important element of the Kent Street streetscape.

The place has a strong or special association with a particular community or cultural group for social, cultural or spiritual reasons.

As a hotel and public building for nearly 120 years, the Hotel Francis is important to the local community.
