= Post Office Hotel =

Post Office Hotel, Maryborough
- Location within Queensland Location within Australia
- 25.538°S 152.7042°E
- Location: Bazaar Street, Maryborough, Fraser Coast Region, Queensland, Australia

History
- Design period: 1870s–1890s (late 19th century)
- Built: 1889

Site notes
- Architect: Victor Emmanuel Carandini

Queensland Heritage Register
- Official name: Post Office Hotel
- Type: state heritage (built)
- Designated: 21 October 1992
- Reference no.: 600691
- Significant period: 1880s (fabric); 1889–ongoing (historical use)
- Significant components: furniture/fittings
- Builders: Mr Murray

Post Office Hotel is a heritage-listed hotel at Bazaar Street, Maryborough, Fraser Coast Region, Queensland, Australia. It was designed by Victor Emmanuel Carandini and built in 1889 by Mr Murray. It was added to the Queensland Heritage Register on 21 October 1992.

== History ==
The Post Office Hotel was built in 1889, for Messrs Hanley and Williams of Maryborough to a design of Victor Emmanuel Carandini, a Brisbane architect. The building replaced a previous single storeyed building on the site, also called the Post Office Hotel.

The land on which the Post Office hotel was constructed was originally acquired by ET Aldridge by a Deed of Grant in May 1852. The original one storeyed masonry Post Office Hotel was constructed in about 1870 one year after the construction of the adjacent Maryborough Post Office, after which it was named. Aldridge retained the site until 1878 when it was sold to Mr John O'Brien, and Messrs Hanley and Williams acquired the property by 1889.

By this time, the Licensing Authority operating within the Maryborough district, under the provisions of the Licensing Act of 1885, were becoming more strict with the licensees of hotels about the condition of the buildings and provision of services. In May 1889 the licensee of the former Post Office Hotel, GW Gaynor was refused a further annual licence for the single storeyed building which then existed, and it was then decided by the owners, Messrs Hanley and Williams, that a new building was needed.

On August 7, 1889, the tender of Mr Murray, a local builder, was accepted to construct a new two storeyed building to the designs of Victor Emmanuel Carandini, an architect from Brisbane. A substantial brick building was constructed in 1889 and this is the date indicated on the entrance corner parapet.

The early post supported verandah which lined the two principal facades of the building, was replaced with a cantilevered version, in line with a general movement in Maryborough to modernise the central business area in the 1930s by replacing all post supported awnings with cantilevered alternatives. The early verandah extended on the ground floor to the street line and was supported on cast iron columns, and featured cast iron brackets and frieze. The upper floor, which has also suffered modernisation, retains the bull nosed awning, but originally had slender turned timber balusters and timber venetian blinds on the outside edge.

== Description ==
The Post Office Hotel is a two storeyed brick building, with cantilevered first floor verandah, located prominently on the corner of Wharf and Bazaar Streets, Maryborough.

Principal facades address both streets, with entrance to the accommodation and dining rooms from Wharf Street and the access to the incorporated ground floor shops from Bazaar Street. The external walls to the street, of bagged and painted brick, are surmounted by a partially rendered brick parapet, concealing a hipped corrugated iron roof. The truncated corner of the hotel is emphasised by a signage panel, projecting beyond the parapet, with "POST OFFICE HOTEL - 1889", surmounted by an open-topped pediment. The parapet features rosettes above moulded string courses supported on paired plaster corbels. Several rendered finials are placed along the parapet, with a slightly larger feature one on each elevation emphasising the principal entrance from that side. The building rests on a rendered masonry base, though which ventilation holes are punched.

The cantilevered verandah, extending the entire length of the principal facades, has a bull-nosed awning supported on reeded cast iron columns, and featuring cast iron frieze and brackets. The timber slatted balustrade is a replacement. The rear of the building has a two storeyed post supported verandah, onto which internal rooms are accessed.

Openings to the ground floor have moulded plaster surrounds, and retain some early joinery and leadlight glazing, although there are some replacement louvres. First floor openings are generally inward opening, half glazed, French doors with operable fanlights above.

Internally, the ground floor comprises the public bar, shops, and entrance and stair halls off which the dining room is accessed. The dining room is clad with timber sheeting, and the beaded board ceiling features cast iron ceiling roses. A carved timber chimney piece, complete with cast iron fittings remains intact, though painted. The public bar has been substantially altered although an early glazed door remains.

The cedar, three-quarter-turn open well stair features fine turned balusters, carved newel and turning posts, and a swan-necked handrail. The first floor comprises many timber framed accommodation rooms clad with tongue and groove boarding and accessed from a central corridor featuring plaster arches and skylights at various intervals. This floor remains substantially intact, in planform and fabric, with early joinery, glazing, timber floors and internal fittings.

== Heritage listing ==
The Post Office Hotel was listed on the Queensland Heritage Register on 21 October 1992 having satisfied the following criteria.

The place is important in demonstrating the evolution or pattern of Queensland's history.

The hotel, which has been operating since about 1870 in varied when the town prospered as a major port.

The place is important in demonstrating the principal characteristics of a particular class of cultural places.

The building displays the principal characteristics of a Queensland country town hotel, in its corner situation, verandah arrangement and internal planning.

The place is important because of its aesthetic significance.

The hotel is significant for its contribution to the Wharf Street area of Maryborough, and is a good substantially intact example of Queensland hotel architecture.

The place has a strong or special association with a particular community or cultural group for social, cultural or spiritual reasons.

As an operating hotel and public centre for about 125 years the Post office Hotel is significant for its value to the local community.
