= Engineers' Arms Hotel =

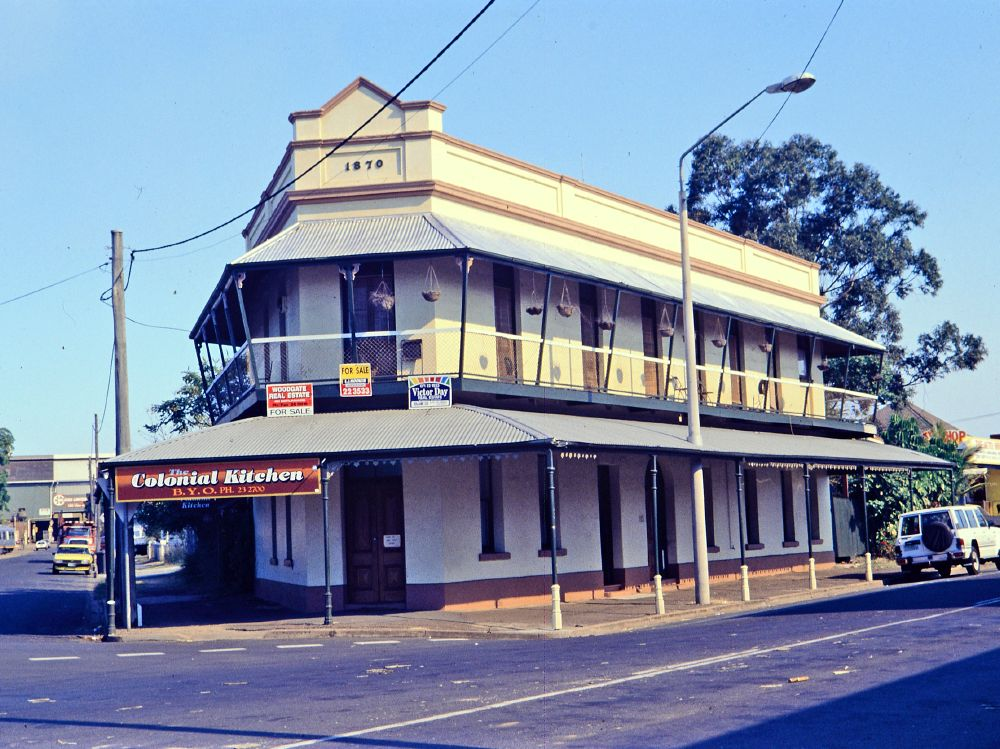
- Former Engineers' Arms Hotel, 1995

- Location within Queensland Location within Australia
- 25.541°S 152.7058°E
- Location: 115 March Street, Maryborough, Fraser Coast Region, Queensland, Australia

History
- Design period: 1870s–1890s (late 19th century)
- Built: 1889

Site notes
- Architect: Samuel Bragg

Queensland Heritage Register
- Official name: Engineers' Arms Hotel (former), Mayfair Boarding House, Former Engineers' Arms Hotel
- Type: state heritage (built)
- Designated: 21 October 1992
- Reference no.: 600695
- Significant period: 1880s (fabric); 1889–1950s? (historical use as pub)
- Builders: Mr Caldwell

Engineers' Arms Hotel is a heritage-listed former hotel at 115 March Street, Maryborough, Fraser Coast Region, Queensland, Australia. It was designed by Samuel Bragg and built in 1889 by Mr Caldwell. It is also known as Mayfair Boarding House. It was added to the Queensland Heritage Register on 21 October 1992.

== History ==
The former Engineers' Arms Hotel in Maryborough was constructed in 1889 for Ann Dillane, to designs of Samuel Bragg, a local architect. It replaced an earlier building, also called the Engineers' Arms.

Settlement at Maryborough commenced in September 1847 when George Furber established a woolstore on the south bank of the Mary River at the head of navigation. He was followed in June 1848 by ET Aldridge and Henry and RE Palmer, who established their own wharves on the opposite riverbank, at a location now known as the original Maryborough town site at Baddow. In 1850 a new town site was surveyed to the east, at a downstream position which provided better access for shipping. The first sale of land at this new site occurred in 1852, but most residents did not shift to the current centre of Maryborough until 1855 and 1856. Maryborough was gazetted a Port of Entry in 1859 and was proclaimed a municipality, the Borough of Maryborough, in 1861. During the 1860s and 1870s it flourished as the principal port for the nearby Gympie goldfield and as an outlet for timber and sugar. The establishment of manufacturing plants and primary industries sustained growth in the town into the twentieth century.

The property on which the hotel is situated was first purchased by William Southerden as a Town Lot on 17 April 1861. The next registered owner was Thomas Dillane who bought the property on 13 December 1872, though he is known to have been running the former hotel on the site since at least 1870.

The former Engineers' Arms is so known for the adjacent Walkers' Engineering Works and Foundry which began operations in 1868, supplying mining equipment firstly to the goldfields which were flourishing in Gympie and then, later, more widely. The original two- storey timber hotel may have been constructed in 1870, as the date on the parapet of the present building indicates.

By 1889, the Licensing Authority operating within the Maryborough district, under the provisions of the Licensing Act 1885, was becoming stricter with the licensees of hotels about the condition of the buildings and provision of services. It may have been as a result of this that the Engineers' Arms Hotel was replaced with a two-storey brick building, to a design by Samuel Bragg, who was a former employee of the Works Department. The building was constructed by local contractor Mr Caldwell and ready for business on 5 July 1889.

Two single-storey brick cottages at the rear of the hotel were thought to have been constructed as residential accommodation at this time.

Changes to the building fabric include the narrowing of the upper floor verandah, where, it seems the timber had rotted at the ends and was therefore cut away making it necessary to taper the verandah posts from their original fixed position to the new narrower width of the walkway.

The hotel, which ceased operating in 1951, has subsequently been the Mayfair Guest or Boarding House, a restaurant, community centre and otherwise used as accommodation. In September 2015, it was advertised for sale as having four leased commercial spaces with a first-floor apartment.

== Description ==
The former Engineers' Arms Hotel is a two-storeyed rendered brick building located on what once was a five-way intersection but is now four-way. The site contains two single-storeyed brick buildings to the rear of the hotel.

The hotel, which has a hipped corrugated iron roof concealed by a string coursed parapet, is built to the property boundary of an acute angled block, giving it a V-shaped plan, truncated at the corner. The corner is emphasised with the addition of a pedimental element, projecting above the parapet. A relief moulding of the date "1870" appears on the parapet on this corner.

The building is lined on the March, Kent and Bowen Street facades with a two-storeyed verandah. The ground level of this has a shallow curved corrugated iron awning supported on cast iron columns, many of which have been replaced. The upper floor verandah, which continues to the rear of the building, has a skillion awning supported on timber columns which taper outwards from the building, due to the altered width of the verandah walkway.

There are three entrances to the hotel from the principal facades, a corner entrance, being a double, four-panelled and moulded timber door, to what was previously the public bar; and two doorways on March Street, one through an arched opening featuring multi-pane glazed sidelights and transom, and a four-panelled and moulded timber door. The exterior joinery is substantially intact and of high quality. All openings are untreated but for plaster sills.

The arched doorway leads to the stair hall, off which the principal ground floor rooms are accessed as well as the timber dog-legged stair. The stairway is naturally lit by an arched landing window. Internally, the building retains much of its early joinery, ceiling and wall cladding, timber ceiling roses and fireplaces. The plan arrangement remains intact.

== Heritage listing ==
The former Engineers' Arms Hotel was listed on the Queensland Heritage Register on 21 October 1992 having satisfied the following criteria.

The place is important in demonstrating the evolution or pattern of Queensland's history.

The building demonstrates the growth of Maryborough, particularly as a result of the Gympie goldrush, when Maryborough began producing mining equipment in the area where the hotel stands.

The place is important because of its aesthetic significance.

The building is an important element of the streetscapes of the town, and is an interesting example of Queensland country town hotel architecture.

The place has a strong or special association with a particular community or cultural group for social, cultural or spiritual reasons.

As the local hotel for the foundry workers for over one hundred years, the Engineers' Arms Hotel has considerable social value to the surrounding community.
