= Oddfellows Home Hotel =

Heritage-listed former hotel

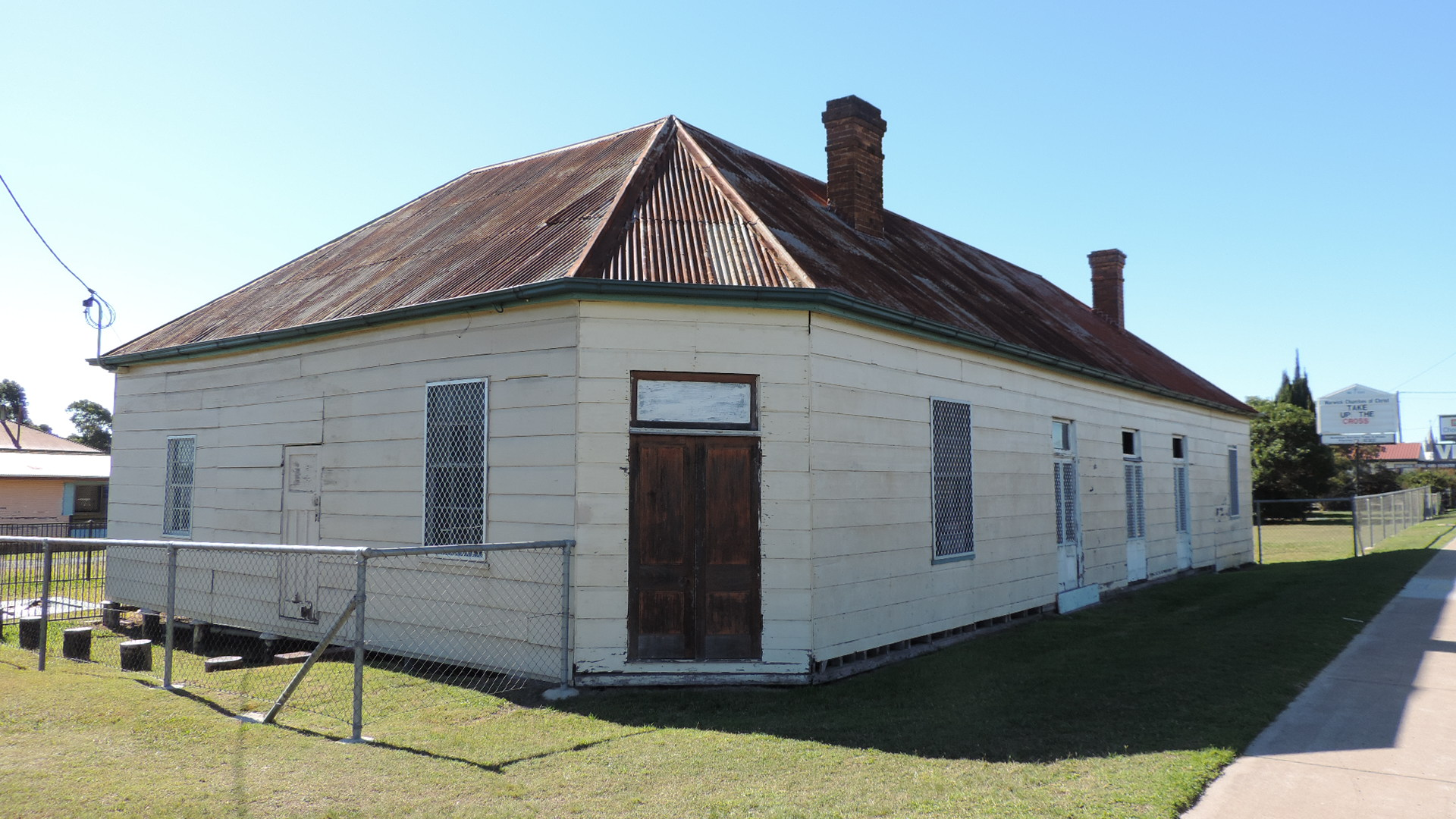
- Oddfellows Home Hotel, 2015

- Location within Queensland Location within Australia
- 28.2191°S 152.0252°E
- Location: corner of Wood and Wantley Streets, Warwick, Southern Downs Region, Queensland, Australia

History
- Design period: 1870s–1890s (late 19th century)
- Built: 1876–

Queensland Heritage Register
- Official name: Oddfellows Home Hotel (former), Harp of Erin
- Type: state heritage (built)
- Designated: 6 July 2004
- Reference no.: 602199
- Significant period: 1876 (fabric, historical); 1950s (historical)
- Significant components: hotel / inn, hostel

Oddfellows Home Hotel is a heritage-listed former hotel at the corner of Wood and Wantley Streets, Warwick, Southern Downs Region, Queensland, Australia. It was built from 1876 onwards . It is also known as Harp of Erin. It was added to the Queensland Heritage Register on 6 July 2004.

== History ==
The building formerly known as the Oddfellow's Home Hotel and located at the corner of Wood and Wantley Streets, Warwick, is of timber construction and was built in 1876 for Louis Muller.

The allotment on which this building is situated was first alienated in 1861 as Allotment 1 of Section 55, parish of Warwick, county Merivale (1 rood 35 perches (1,900 m^{2})), by John May of Rosenthal, at a cost of just over £3. Warwick was proclaimed a municipality (the Borough of Warwick) in that same year and over the subsequent 20 years it was consolidated as a regional centre of the southern Darling Downs. This growth is reflected in the number of public houses that were established in Warwick during the 1860s and 1870s to cater for the town's expanding population. One of these establishments was the Oddfellow's Home Hotel built in 1876 for Louis Muller. Following the discovery of tin at Quart Pot Creek, Stanthorpe, in 1871, Muller spent a couple of years there as a miner before moving to Warwick where he first appears as licensee for the Prince of Wales Hotel on the corner of Percy and Wantley Streets in 1873. Extant title documents do not make it clear when Muller purchased from John May the allotment which contains the present building, however in April 1876 his application for licensing a "a new house" on the corner of Wood and Wantley Streets was deferred because the building was not completed. Five months later, Muller inserted an advertisement in the Warwick Examiner and Times announcing the opening of his hotel. It was described as "large and commodious, and offers comfortable accommodation for boarders", and it was promoted as a place "where all who call there will find every comfort, and where they can rely upon obtaining Really Genuine Liquors". Muller was a prominent member of the Rose Lodge of Oddfellows in Warwick and he named his hotel after this secular association. While there is no documentary evidence indicating that meetings of Oddfellows were held at Muller's hotel, a function for the Star of the Downs Lodge in 1878 was hosted at the Oddfellow's Home Hotel and it is clear that through Muller a connection with the society was maintained.

When Muller died in May 1886, the license for the hotel was registered in the name of his wife, Frances Muller, who held the property until 1889 when it was transferred to John Joseph Henry. Henry's brother, James, was licensee for the hotel from 1891 to 1892, before John Henry was again registered as the hotelkeeper until 1895. Warwick rate books indicate the property was valued at £260 in the mid-1890s and in 1896 Alexander Joseph Stephens is listed as occupier of the property. In 1897 title documents show Bernard Hughes, a local farmer, as owner of the property and it was around this time that the hotel was renamed the Harp of Erin, under which sign it operated until de-licensed in 1949. Rate books for 1898 record Alexander Stephens as the owner and occupier of the hotel and the following year title to the property was registered to Catherine Stephens, wife of Alexander. At this time improvements valued at £100 were made to the property and Catherine Stephens maintained the hotel until 1904 when it was leased to Thomas Olsen.

When Catherine died in April 1905 her estate was held in trust by Robert Cox. Following the expiration of Olsen's lease in 1910 several new lessees were appointed until Mary Cantwell, wife of Daniel Cantwell, became the hotelkeeper in 1918. Six years later, title to the property was transferred to Bernard Alexander Stephens and Ernest Joseph Stephens, and the latter became sole title holder the same year. Ernest sold his share in 1925 to John McDonnell, who that same year transferred the property to Daniel Cantwell. When Cantwell died in 1949 the hotel was de-licensed and the property registered in the name of Patrick Joseph Cantwell. During the 1950s the building was used as low-budget accommodation for boarders and some internal modifications carried out. When Patrick Cantwell died the property was transferred to his wife, Dorothy May Cantwell, in 1976 and the following year it was sold to the Churches of Christ. Until the mid-1980s the building was used as a shelter for homeless people and it is currently used as a meeting house and as a centre for local community activities.

== Description ==
Located on the corner of Wantley Street and Wood Street, the main road out of Warwick to the south and west, the Oddfellows Home Hotel is a single storey timber building with a corrugated iron hipped roof. U-shaped in plan, it is positioned near the southwest corner of a large block, close to the street alignments.

The building has been built in stages and is somewhat modified. It is a timber-framed building set on very low stumps and clad in chamfer boards. The building is at the level of the footpath on Wood Street and falls slightly to the rear. Originally a simple L-shaped plan of two single storey wings, the building has been extended at the eastern end of the Wood Street wing. The oldest part of the building is clad in very wide chamfer boards, approximately 10–11 inches (250–280 mm) and lined with wide horizontal beaded boards.

The steeply pitched roof is timber framed and clad in painted corrugated iron. It has no overhangs as the former hotel was originally built with verandahs. The front verandahs were replaced by enclosed skillion roofed bays which have recently been demolished. On the western or Wantley Street elevation the floor, framing and stumps of the enclosed bay remains. The rear U-shaped verandah is of relatively recent construction. The low pitched roof of this verandah conceals the top of a transom light over a rear door.

The south elevation facing Wood Street is clad in the wide chamfer boards and has three sets of timber framed French doors with transom lights, flanked by double hung windows. Two brick chimneys protrude from the roof, the one closer to the street corner being a double flue. A cut in the chamfer boards on the Wood Street elevation, in line with the easternmost chimney, shows the extent of the original hotel. The Wantley Street elevation is also clad in the wide chamfer boards. Openings in this wall have been recently altered in association with the demolition of the enclosed bay. They consist of a partly glazed timber door flanked by double hung windows of different sizes. The main entrance to the building is located on the street corner in a short section of wall placed at 45 degrees to the adjoining walls. A pair of timber panelled doors with a transom light open directly into the interior of the building.

The Wantley Street wing including the room on the corner is presently a single space as most of the internal dividing walls have been demolished. A hatch in the timber floor leads to an excavated subfloor area retained by timber slabs which may have once been a cellar. A brick fireplace is located in the centre of the eastern wall of the corner room. It is part of a double fireplace also facing into an adjoining large room used for meetings and activities. This activities room, located in the Wood Street wing, has three sets of French doors and an additional brick fireplace at the eastern end. A kitchen lined with cement sheeting is positioned on the northern side of the activities room. At the western end of the kitchen is a short hallway leading to the rear verandah and at the eastern end is a small storage room. A door beside the eastern fireplace in the activities room opens into the eastern wing, the addition to the Wood Street wing.

The eastern wing is clad in narrower chamfer boards and lined with VJ timber boards. Its eastern elevation has double hung windows with metal hoods. Consisting of a row of four adjoining rooms accessed from the rear verandah, this wing has single skin partition walls of vertical VJ boards with belt rails.

Some rooms of the building, notably the Wantley Street wing, are in a state of partial demolition. Recent works include the removal of doors and windows and the creation of new openings, the repair of some areas of floor with wide wallboards, the insertion of steel beams where existing walls have been removed and the demolition of some ceilings. The wallboards in the Wantley Street wing have been removed and partly repositioned with the back of the beaded boards facing into the rooms. Much of this wing is unlined. Some partly constructed new work adjoins the building. His work includes timber framing for a toilet block and access ramps to the rear verandah.

== Heritage listing ==
The former Oddfellows Home Hotel was listed on the Queensland Heritage Register on 6 July 2004 having satisfied the following criteria.

The place is important in demonstrating the evolution or pattern of Queensland's history.

The building formerly known as the Oddfellow's Home Hotel was constructed in 1876 for Louis Muller, a hotelkeeper of Warwick. It is important in demonstrating the evolution or pattern of Queensland's history insofar as it is representative of the emergence of Warwick as an important regional centre of the Darling Downs. The site remains as surviving evidence of the early development of the municipality of Warwick in a period of both economic and demographic expansion.

The place is important in demonstrating the principal characteristics of a particular class of cultural places.

The building provides a relatively well-preserved and rare example of early Queensland hotel architecture and is one of the oldest surviving public houses in Warwick.

The place is important because of its aesthetic significance.

Despite alterations and additions over the years, much of the original fabric and features of the building remain intact, which gives it individual aesthetic value and makes it a valued part of the historical character of the local area.
