= Royal Hotel, Bathurst =

Royal Hotel
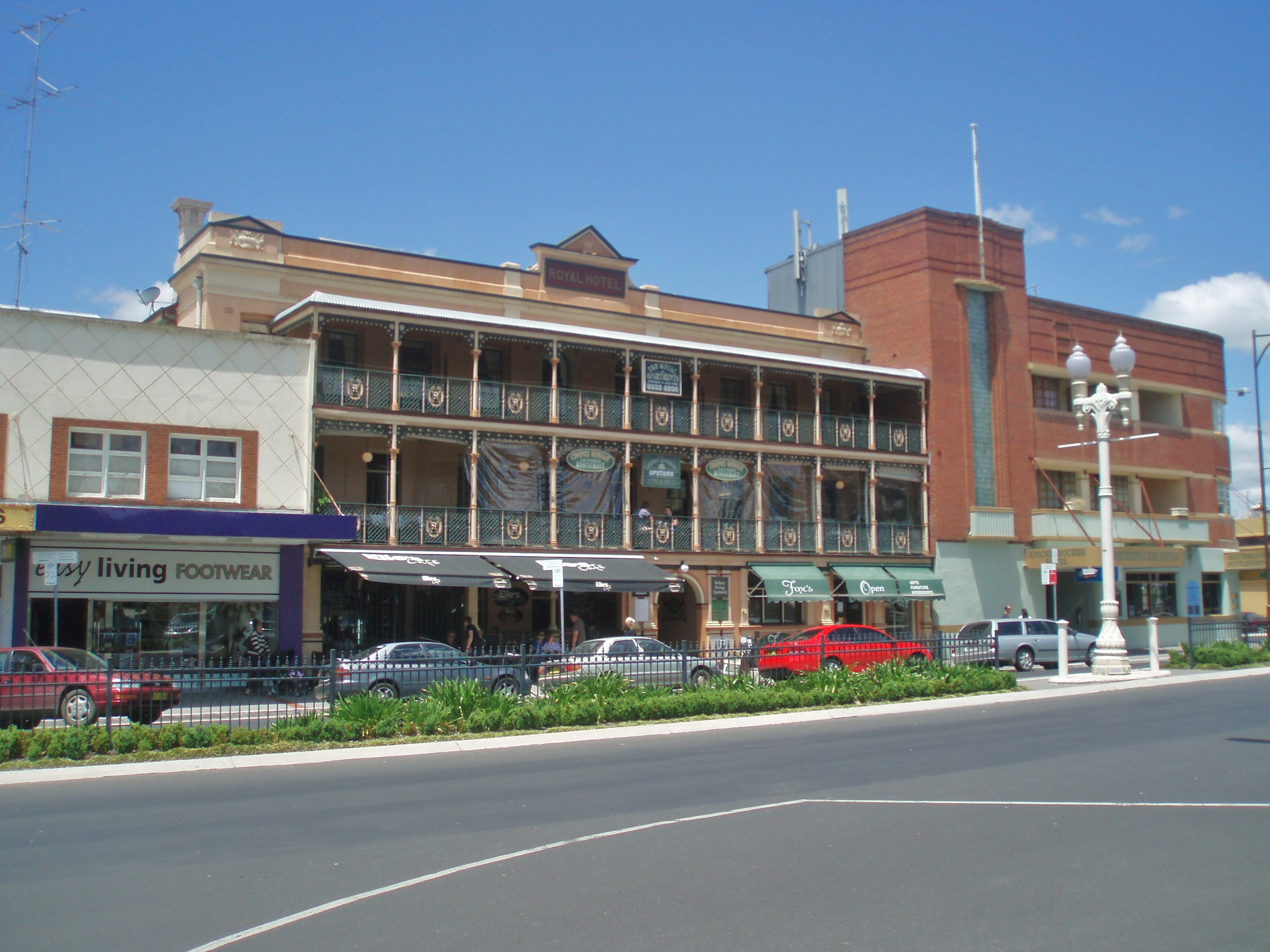
- The Royal Hotel, pictured in 2010

- Location within New South Wales Location within Australia
- 33°25′07″S 149°34′49″E
- Location: 108 William Street, Bathurst, Bathurst Region, New South Wales, Australia

History
- Built: c. 1840s–1990

Site notes
- Architectural style: Victorian Filigree

New South Wales Heritage Register
- Official name: Royal Hotel
- Type: State heritage (built)
- Designated: 2 April 1999
- Reference no.: 111
- Type: Hotel
- Category: Commercial

The Royal Hotel is a heritage-listed former hotel and now commercial and apartment building located at 108 William Street, Bathurst, Bathurst Region, New South Wales, Australia. The property is privately owned. It was added to the New South Wales State Heritage Register on 2 April 1999.

== History ==
The Royal is one of the oldest surviving hotels in Bathurst. The original building was constructed in the 1840s. The hotel was gradually enlarged and embellished during the latter part of the nineteenth century. This development culminated in the three storied balconied facade to William Street with its rich cast iron decoration added in the 1880s. This facade is largely retained on the two upper floors and could be seen as the ultimate aesthetic development of the building.

The land on which it was built was granted to George Kable on 7 May 1805. In October 1842 the Hotel was purchased by Nicholas Read. On Read's death in 1863 the property passed to his son Richard who in 1869 mortgaged the property to Blunden and Meyer.

The hotel was offered to let by tender in the Bathurst Free Press and Mining Journal on 4 December 1872. The tender notice indicates that at the time the Royal was a two-storey establishment with 8 parlours, 30 bedrooms, a dining/assembly hall seating 300, billiard room, kitchens and 2 stables accommodating 40 horses.

In the Bathurst Times of 25 March 1878 it was noted that "improvements" had been carried to the Royal. These included alterations and additions to the verandah and 'tastefully arranged open work screen with circular headed doorway abutting the footpath. They were apparently a great success as their effect was "not as of a mere improvement but that a new and handsome building has been erected". The hotel was still a two storeyed building.

The hotel was put up for auction by Blunden and Meyer in 1880 and was purchased by George Denny for A£5,010. It was probable that George Denny added the third level and cast iron verandahs that appear in the 1880 photograph.

Noted in the Bathurst Guide, 1893, the Royal had added its third storey and provided accommodation for 75 people. The dining room appears to have reduced in size from the 300 capacity noted in 1872 to seating for 80 people.

The present tiled facade of the ground floor was added in the 1940s. The Royal Hotel closed in the early 1960s.

In the 1980s, the National Trust of Australia (NSW) and the Bathurst community expressed concern for the future of the building. In recognition of the building's State significance and to ensure its future the Heritage Council of NSW recommended to the Minister the making of a Permanent Conservation Order. A Permanent Conservation Order was placed over the building on 7 October 1983.

The Department of Planning in conjunction with Bathurst City Council purchased the property with a view to restoring the building. A Conservation Policy was prepared by Havenhand & Mather Architects in 1985.

In 1987 the building was offered for sale through tender. The building was sold and the restoration of the building, in accordance with the Conservation Policy by Havenhand & Mather Architects, was a condition of sale. In the early 1990s the Royal Hotel was restored with funds provided by the Heritage Assistance Program. (Heritage Office files)

== Description ==
The Victorian verandahs and pediment added in the 1880s was in 1985 still largely intact and featured excellent cast iron posts and railings – including a personalised "R" to the shield on each bay.

The physical condition of the building was reported to be excellent as of 24 July 2000.

== Heritage listing ==
The Royal Hotel operated for approximately 120 years and forms a major part of the social history of Bathurst and has been a participant in or the backdrop to, many of the historical events of the city. It is also the only example of an elaborate three storey verandah hotel surviving in Bathurst and is prominently situated near the south-eastern end of King's Parade making a distinctive contribution to the townscape of the Bathurst Urban Conservation Area.

Royal Hotel was listed on the New South Wales State Heritage Register on 2 April 1999 having satisfied the following criteria.

The place is important in demonstrating the course, or pattern, of cultural or natural history in New South Wales.

The Royal Hotel has formed and played a continuous and significant role in the history of Bathurst for over 140 years.

The place is important in demonstrating aesthetic characteristics and/or a high degree of creative or technical achievement in New South Wales.

The fine Victorian verandah facade of the Royal Hotel is the last remaining example of a style once common to Bathurst. The Royal Hotel makes an important contribution to the streetscape and urban environment of Kins Parade, the heart of the urban and civic area of Bathurst.

The place has strong or special association with a particular community or cultural group in New South Wales for social, cultural or spiritual reasons.

It was the leading Bathurst hotel of the nineteenth and early twentieth century and was important in the social development of Australia's oldest inland city.
