= Bloomfield Lodge =

Rainforest lodge in Far North Queensland, Australia

Ever Bloomfield
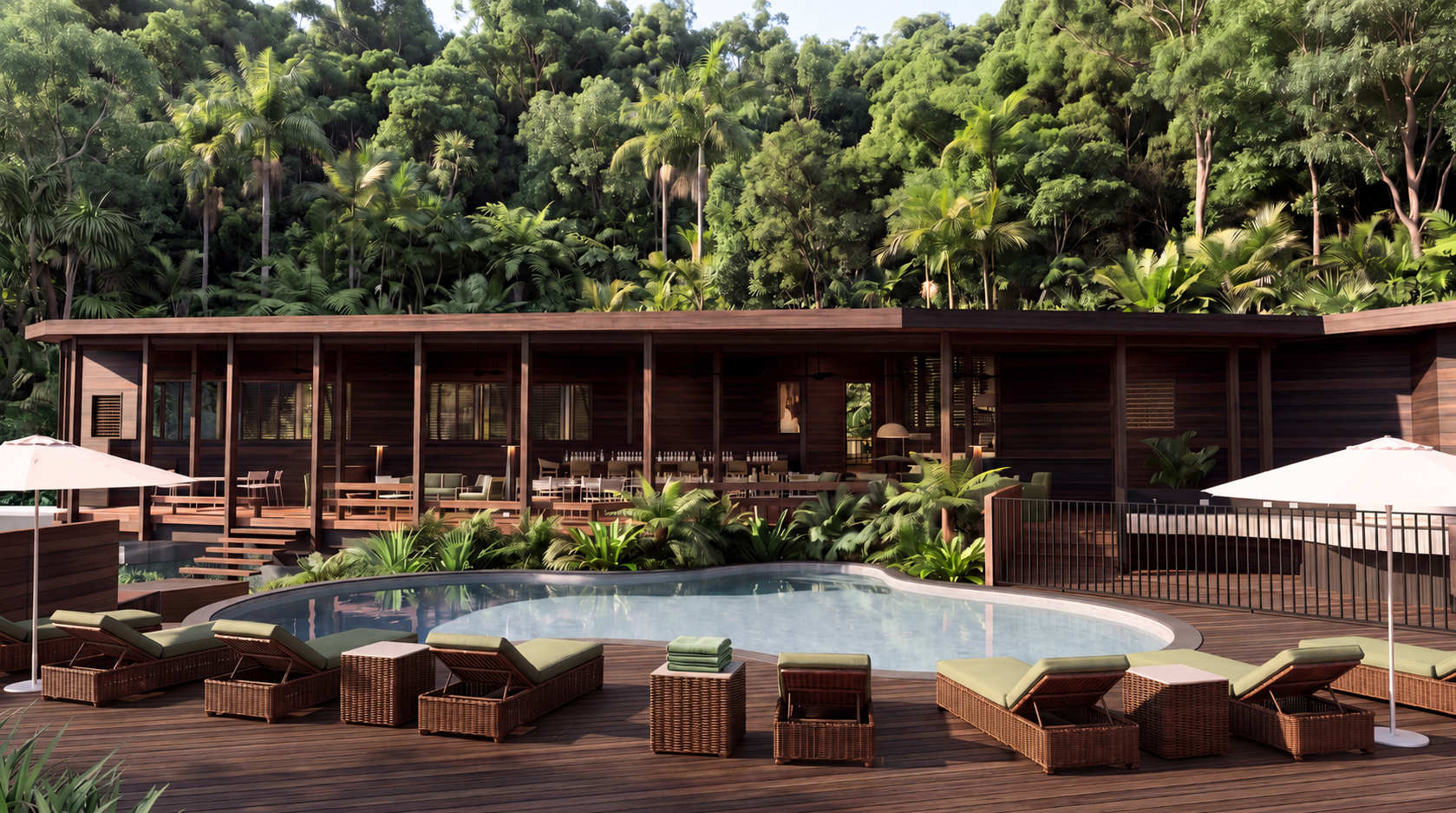
- Pool and lodge exterior
- Interactive map of the Ever Bloomfield area
- Former names: Bloomfield Lodge

General information
- Location: Australia
- Coordinates: 15.92627°S 145.37915°E
- Owner: Mike Gooley

Website
- everlodges.com/bloomfield

Bloomfield Lodge, formerly known as Peppers Bloomfield Lodge and now operating as Ever Bloomfield, is a boutique rainforest lodge set between the Great Barrier Reef and Daintree Rainforest in Far North Queensland, Australia. It is one of Australia’s most exclusive retreats and a member of Small Luxury Hotels of the World and Drake & Cavendish. The Lodge's location allows for stargazing and claims the ability to see more than 3,000 stars with the naked eye.

Bloomfield Lodge is owned by Mike Gooley who also owns Trailfinders, a UK travel company, and Hinterland Aviation, an airline based in Cairns that is used to ferry hotel guests to the nearby grass strip airfield.
