= 139–153 Sussex Street, Sydney =

Heritage-listed building in Sydney, Australia

139–153 Sussex Street
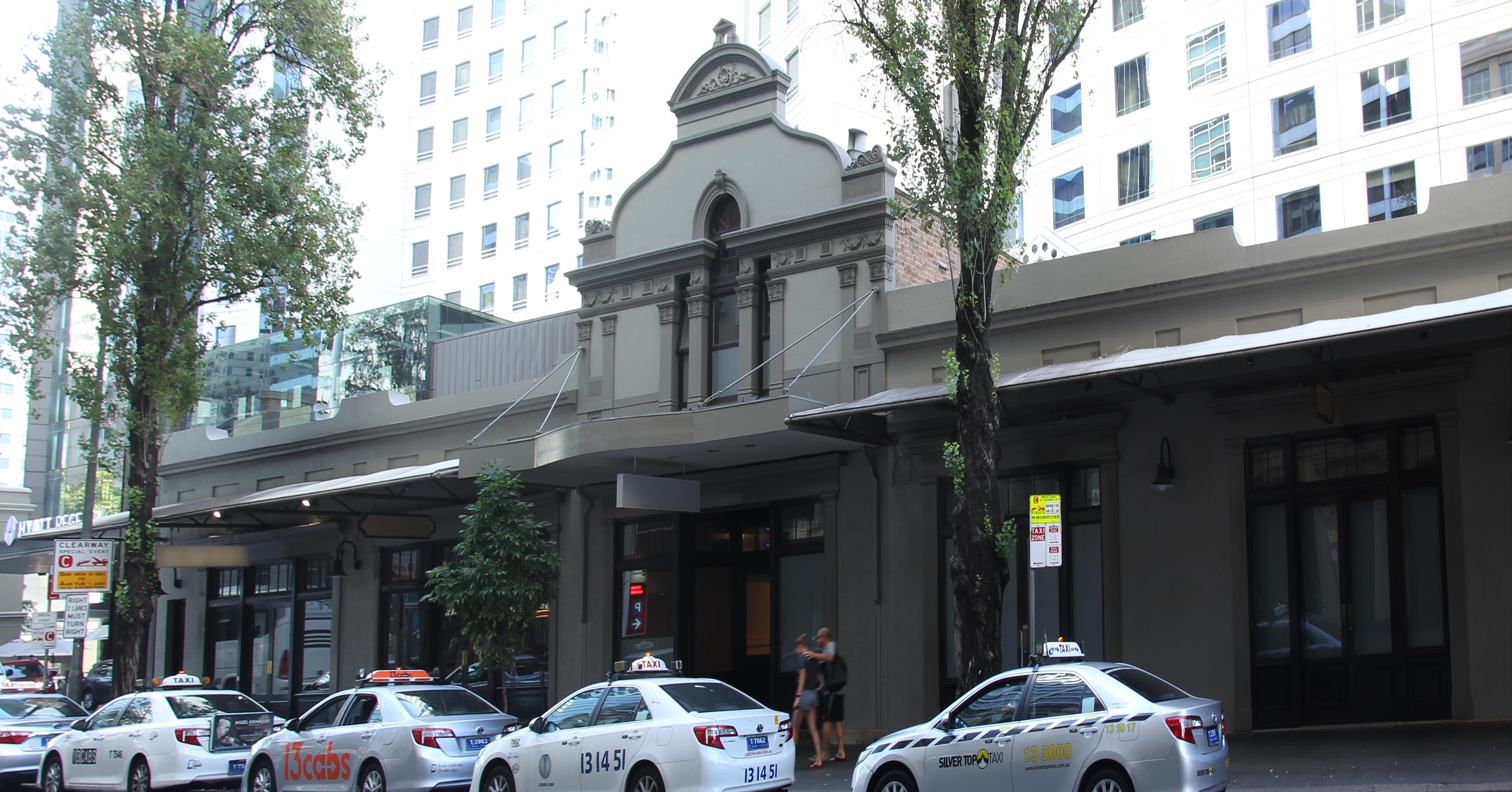

- Location within Sydney Location within Australia
- 33.8697°S 151.2035°E
- Location: 139–153 Sussex Street, Sydney central business district, City of Sydney, New South Wales, Australia

History
- Built: 1850

Site notes
- Owner: Property NSW

New South Wales Heritage Register
- Official name: Warehouses (former); Shops/Warehouses
- Type: State heritage (built)
- Designated: 2 April 1999
- Reference no.: 413
- Type: Other – Commercial
- Category: Commercial

139–153 Sussex Street is a heritage-listed former warehouse and now hotel located at 139–153 Sussex Street, in the Sydney central business district, in the City of Sydney local government area of New South Wales, Australia. It was built from 1850. It is also known as Warehouses (former) and Shops/Warehouses. The property is owned by Property NSW, an agency of the Government of New South Wales. It was added to the New South Wales State Heritage Register on 2 April 1999.

== History ==
The site was originally warehousing built c. 1850s, which serviced the coastal and shipping trades. As such they have historical associations with transport, pastoral and trade developments. They reflect the predominant use of the Sussex Street area as storage, warehousing and markets related to the adjacent wharfage in Darling Harbour.

The residents on the site during the 19th and 20th century were mainly produce and commission agents who incorporated auctioneering into their businesses. In the 1890s The Hunter River Farmers & Consumers Co-operative had its warehouse, offices and agents on the site, possibly taking advantage of the Hunter River Steamship Company's transportation and wharfage next door. Gray & Co were long-time residents on the site in the early 20th century with their warehouse and office facilities in the buildings.

The building were extensively redeveloped c. 1985 into the Four Points Hotel, their façade only remains.

== Description ==
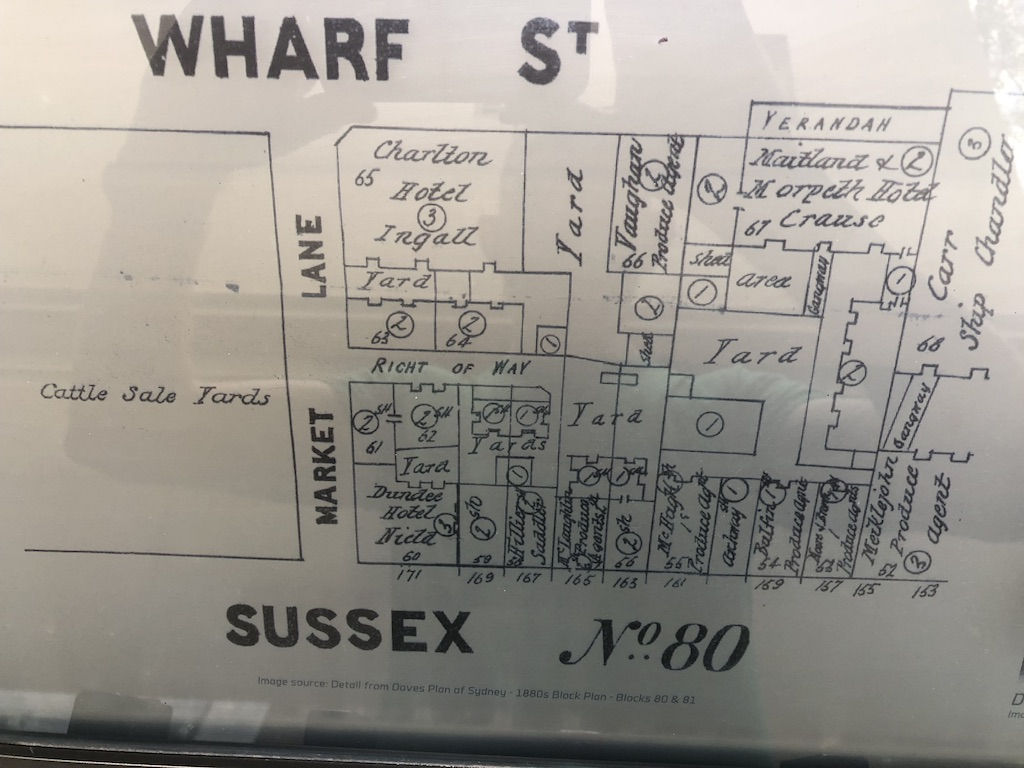
Historical map of the precinct, prior to the Hyatt Regency Sydney development.

Rendered brickwork warehouses with iron roof built during mid 1850s. Single storey to Sussex Street and three storeys at rear. Simple façade with largely original windows and shopfronts. The design and detailing matches that of 149–153 Sussex Street.

=== Condition ===
As at 30 October 2002, exteriors appear sound.

=== Modifications and dates ===
Extensively redeveloped c. 1985 into the Four Points Hotel.

== Heritage listing ==
As at 30 April 2002, an elegantly proportioned terrace of early Victorian warehouses which makes an important contribution to the significance of the Sussex Street Group. A fine example of the commercial architecture of its period.

The Central Warehouses (No. 139–151) together with the Corn Exchange building (No. 173–185) are some of the last remaining remnants of this warehousing and commercial area which serviced Sydney's developing commercial and trading sector in the mid to later 19th century. They comprise a sample of mid to late 19th century warehouse and commercial buildings, that together with other remaining buildings of this era in Sussex Street comprise a homogeneous group with careful attention to design, materials, and workmanship. The Central Warehouse buildings are a good example of a mid 19th century warehouse complex. Their development reflects the essential role that warehouse development has played in the development of Sydney as a commercial and trading centre. The buildings were extensively renovated as part of the Four Points Hotel redevelopment in 1985.

139–153 Sussex Street was listed on the New South Wales State Heritage Register on 2 April 1999 having satisfied the following criteria.

The place is important in demonstrating the course, or pattern, of cultural or natural history in New South Wales.

The buildings were originally warehousing built c. 1855, which serviced the coastal and shipping trade. As such they have historical associations with transport, pastoral and trade developments. They reflect the predominant use of the Sussex Street area as storage, warehousing and markets related to the wharfage in Darling Harbour.

The place is important in demonstrating aesthetic characteristics and/or a high degree of creative or technical achievement in New South Wales.

A fine example of the commercial architecture of its period. The elegantly proportioned terrace of early Victorian warehouses which makes an important contribution to the significance of the Sussex Street Group.

== See also ==
- Australian non-residential architectural styles
