= PACT Centre for Emerging Artists =

Australian performing arts organisation

The PACT Centre for Emerging Artists (short for "Producers Artists Curators Technicians Centre for Emerging Artists"), formerly Producers Authors Composers and Talent and PACT Youth Theatre, is an Australian performing arts organisation and theatre company located in Sydney, New South Wales, catering for new and emerging artists. Its theatre is known as the PACT Theatre.

== History ==
PACT is one of Australia's longest-running arts organisations, having been established in 1964 by Robert Allnutt, Jack Mannix and Patrick Milligan, with intention of creating more Australian work in the performing arts. It was originally Producers Authors Composers and Talent, in 1974 becoming PACT Youth Theatre until 2009, when it adopted the name PACT (Producers Artists Curators Technicians) Centre for Emerging Artists.

Its home was in the Corn Exchange building on Sussex Street, Sydney until January 1988, when it moved to a converted warehouse at 107 Railway Parade, Erskineville, which became the PACT Theatre.

In the early years, PACT focussed on environmental issues, Indigenous stories and experimental films.

At the same time as the move to Erskineville, PACT started focussing on young people, aged 6 to 25. It produced the world premiere of the play Looking for Alibrandi in 1995, based on the 1992 novel of the same name, which sold out for three seasons, leading to the making of the film Looking for Alibrandi and also large pantomimes with "hundreds of kids".

In the late '90s it returned to an emerging artist model. With the change of name in 2009 to its present name, came a change in focus to meeting the needs of artists in their first seven years of professional practice. It also started to examine and practise issues of creative equity, increasing opportunities for artists who identify as Aboriginal and/or Torres Strait Islander, culturally and linguistically diverse, living with a disability, or LGBTQIA+.

The theatre was renovated in 2019.

== Governance and funding ==
In 2014 PACT's artistic director was Katrina Douglas.

In February 2020 the company was restructured, in a pioneering move supported by Create NSW, the arts funding body of the NSW Government. An Artistic Directorate of five practising mid-career artists was appointed: Amrita Hepi, Sarah Houbolt, Tulleah Pearce, Natalie Randall and Malcolm Whittaker, who cover the fields of dance, theatre, performance, interdisciplinary practices, curating and creative producing.

However, the impact of the new structure was affected by the COVID-19 pandemic in Australia, and then Create NSW failed to renew multi-year funding from January 2021.

== Function ==
PACT provides support for over 100 emerging artists each year, providing a pathway for professional development that they may not otherwise have. It also assists new curators, and has partnered with Powerhouse Youth Theatre in Fairfield to allow young Western Sydney artists to perform in the Inner West of the city.

== Resident artists ==
In 2020, PACT's resident artists were:

- Lost All Sorts collective, a dance group who are all recent graduates of NAISDA
- Riana Head-Toussaint, a multidisciplinary artist with disability
- Emma McManus, writer, performer, and co-founder of the Applespiel collective
- Alexander Powers, queer choreographer and performer)

== Alumni ==
Apart from a number of lesser-known people working in theatre around Australia in various roles, alumni of PACT include:

- Geoffrey Atherden
- Peter Weir
- Jack Thompson
- Leonard Teale
- Grahame Bond
- Alex Buzo
- Dorothy Hewett
- Zoe Carides
- Eryn Jean Norvill
- Donna Abela
- Lally Katz
