= 161 Sussex Street, Sydney =

Heritage-listed site in Sydney, Australia

161 Sussex Street
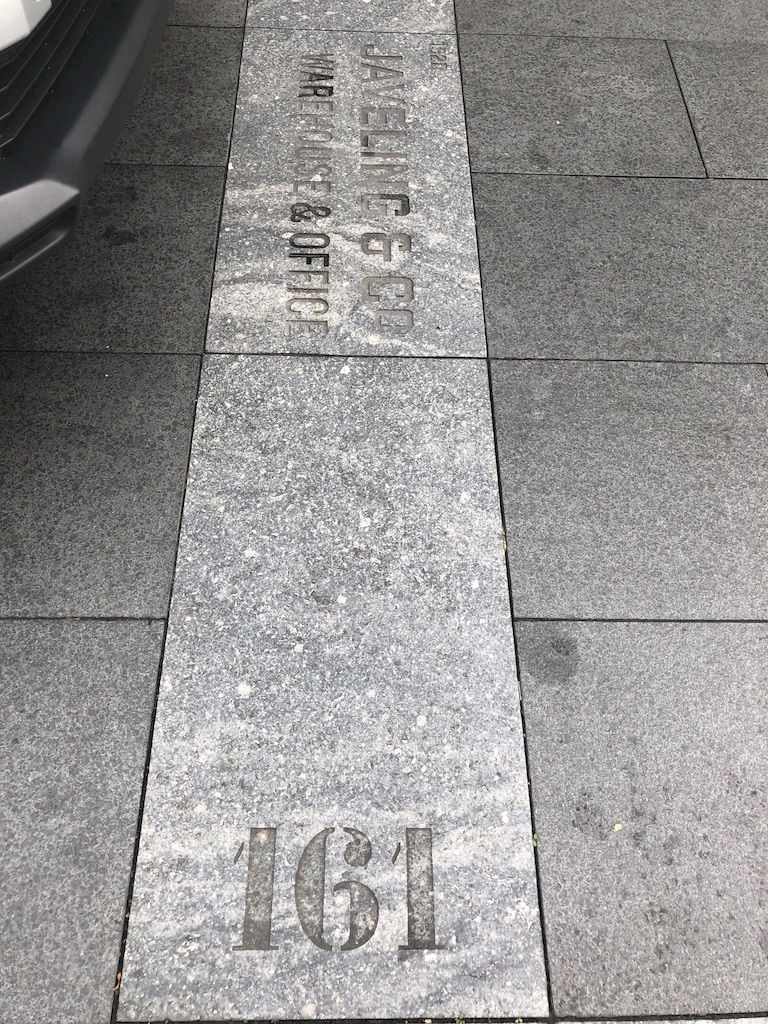
- Street marker at the location of 161 Sussex Street, Sydney, pictured in 2019

- Location within Sydney Location within Australia
- 33.8701°S 151.2036°E
- Location: 161 Sussex Street, Sydney central business district, City of Sydney, New South Wales, Australia

History
- Demolished: Yes

Site notes
- Owner: Property NSW

New South Wales Heritage Register
- Official name: Building
- Type: State heritage (built)
- Designated: 2 April 1999
- Reference no.: 414
- Type: Historic site

161 Sussex Street is a heritage-listed historic site located at 161 Sussex Street, in the Sydney central business district, in the City of Sydney local government area of New South Wales, Australia. The property is owned by Property NSW, an agency of the Government of New South Wales. It was added to the New South Wales State Heritage Register on 2 April 1999.

As of 2016, the heritage-listed hotel forecourt that was previously located at 161 Sussex Street was demolished and made way for the Hyatt Regency Sydney/Four Point development. All that remains is a heritage marker on the driveway in the hotel forecourt.

== Description ==
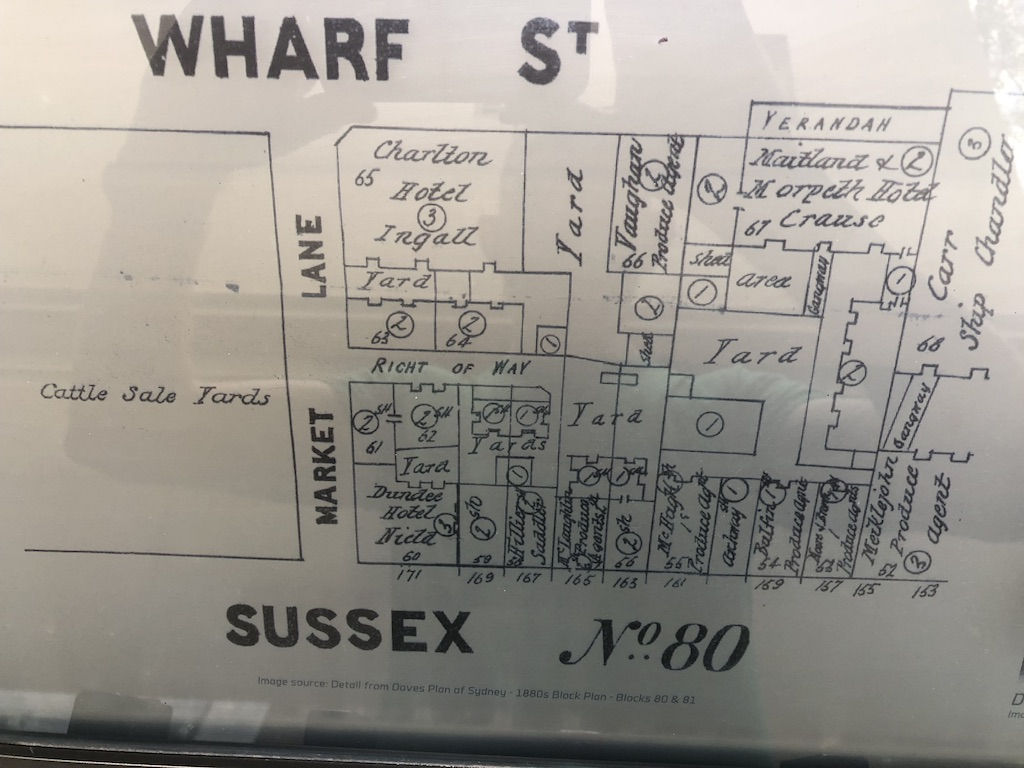
Historical map of the precinct, prior to the Hyatt Regency Sydney development.

The current site forms part of the Hyatt Regency Sydney/Four Points by Sheraton Hotel development. Redeveloped in 2016 by COX Architecture, the heritage-listed site was conserved, and a nearby adjacent 26-storey tower was constructed that added 222 new guest rooms, 3,667 square metres (39,470 sq ft) convention centre, and commercial office space. The additions were completed in the Millennium Minimalist Modernism style.

== Heritage listing ==
161 Sussex Street was listed on the New South Wales State Heritage Register on 2 April 1999.

== See also ==
- Hyatt
