= Bristol Arms Hotel =

Heritage-listed pub in Sydney, Australia

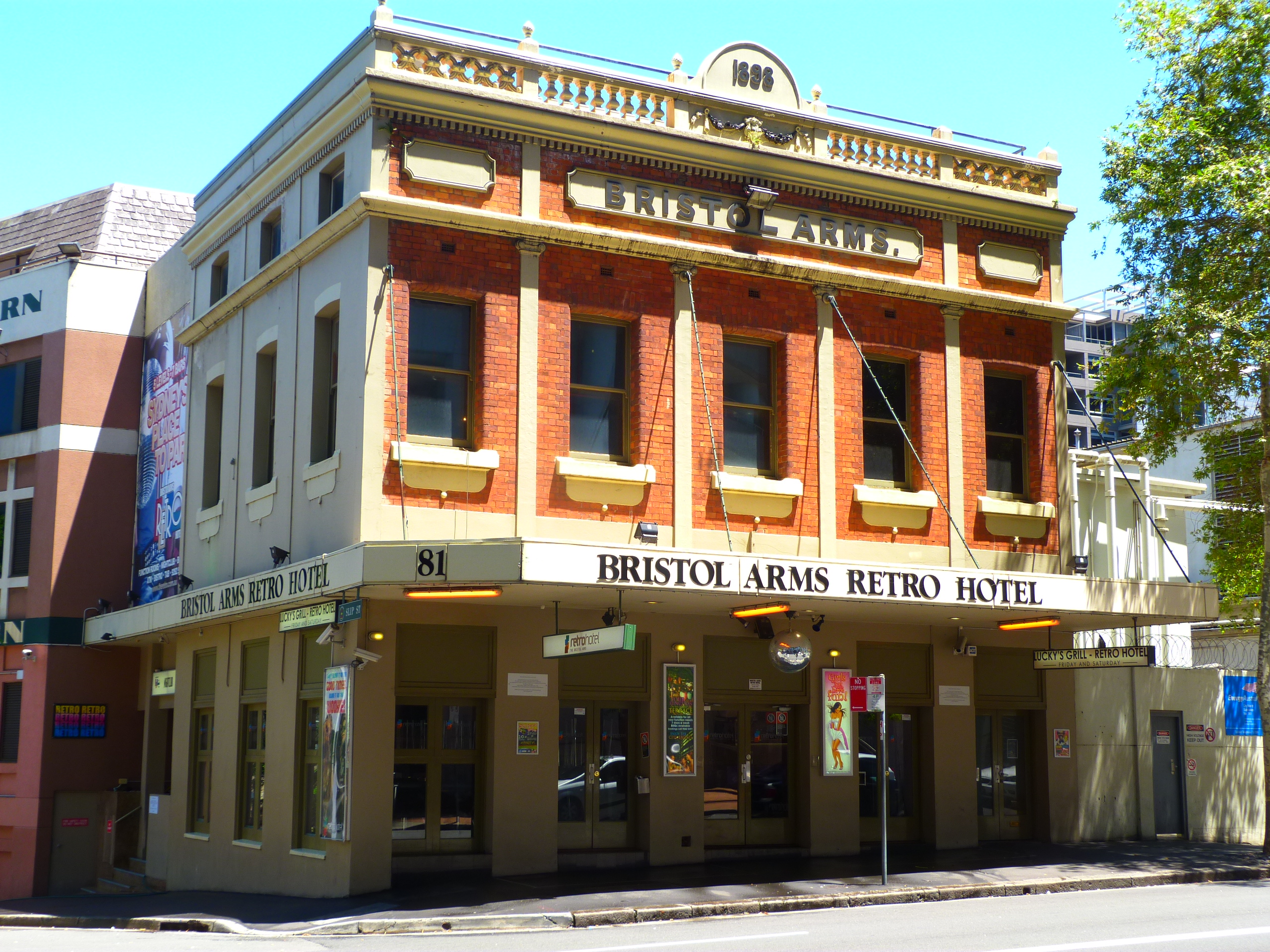
- Bristol Arms Hotel in 2010

- Location within Sydney Location within Australia
- 33.8678°S 151.2032°E
- Location: 81 Sussex Street, Sydney central business district, City of Sydney, New South Wales, Australia

History
- Built: c. 1898

Site notes
- Architectural style: Federation Free Classical

New South Wales Heritage Register
- Official name: Welcome Inn Hotel; Bristol Arms Hotel
- Type: State heritage (built)
- Designated: 2 April 1999
- Reference no.: 408
- Type: Inn/Tavern
- Category: Commercial

Bristol Arms Hotel is a heritage-listed pub located at 81 Sussex Street, in the Sydney central business district, in New South Wales, Australia. It is also known as the Welcome Inn Hotel. It was added to the New South Wales State Heritage Register on 2 April 1999.

== History ==
The coastal Aboriginal people around Sydney are known as the Eora people. Central Sydney is therefore often referred to as "Eora Country". Within the City of Sydney local government area, the traditional owners are the Cadigal and Wangal bands of the Eora. With the invasion of the Sydney region, the Cadigal and Wangal people were decimated but there are descendants still living in Sydney today.

The area along the western side of Sussex Street was occupied from an early date with houses. The Sands Directory records the site of the Bristol Arms Tavern occupied by Henry Ash (carpenter) in 1860. The Patent Slip Inn was sited a few blocks further south and the Bristol Arms Hotel first appeared in 1865-66 at No. 69 Sussex Street. The area immediately behind these buildings was the Darling Harbour waterfront (formerly named Cockle Bay), occupied by the Patent Slip wharf since c. 1833. Sussex Street was the main thoroughfare between the wharves and the town.

The immediate area was resumed by the Government in 1900 after the outbreak of bubonic plague, and placed under the control of the Darling Harbour Resumptions Advisory Board. Control then passed to the Sydney Harbour Trust and in 1939 to the Maritime Services Board. The current Bristol Arms Tavern was built c. 1898. The old Bristol Arms Tavern was probably demolished around this time although no record has been located to confirm these details.

The Sands Directory lists John Booth as licensee (1865–66), and James Blair (1867-69). Francis Blair succeeded him between 1870-1886. The hotel was operated by a succession of publicans between 1887 and 1905. In 1906-08 the hotel was run by Ellen Keyes and named Keyes Hotel, but reverted to the name Bristol Arms in 1907. The building continued to function as a hotel until 1969, when the property was resumed by the Department of Main Roads as part of the realignment of Day Street. From this point it became known as the Welcome Inn Hotel. It subsequently reverted to its original Bristol Arms name. It was reportedly a notoriously rough venue during the 1970s, with Paddy McGuinness describing it as having been a "bloodhouse".

A four-storey extension at the rear of the hotel was completed in April 1994. It underwent a major renovation in 2013, at which time a rooftop bar was added.

== Description ==
The Bristol Arms Hotel is a small-scale three-storey building with cellar, featuring subdued classical detailing in the Federation Free Classical style. A prominent cement balustrade parapet with an arched pediment carries the date of construction. The facade below awning and two side walls are now rendered. The door openings appear original but the doors and windows on the ground floor have been replaced. The interior of the bar has been opened up with the bar moved to the southern side of the space and an opening formed in the rear wall to access the extensive additions to the rear. The new building is a concrete framed structure column and beam with concrete floors. The first floor of the original hotel has been cut horizontally and another floor level included in the original building height. The interior of the upper floor has been completely rebuilt with new access stairs and a lift servicing both buildings from the centre of the site.

== Significance ==
The Bristol Arms Tavern, formerly the Welcome Inn, is located at the western edge of the city and constructed of face brick and render in the Federation Free Classical style. It has significance as part of the network of small purpose built hotels providing a social / recreational venue and budget accommodation within a short distance of the waterfront and the city centre. The Bristol Arms is one of five hotels of this style in the city, the others being the Metropolitan Hotel, the Harbour View Hotel, the Lismore and the Ship Inn. It has significance for continuing traditions of the hotel trade from the last few years of the nineteenth century, and as part of the redevelopment of the area after the reconstruction of the Darling Harbour wharves. It is representative as an example of the evolutionary process of a small corner hotel at the fringe of the city. Although the facades of the building have been modified, they retain some aesthetic significance due to the simplified classical ornamentation which reflects the social character of the area.

== Heritage listing ==
Bristol Arms Hotel was listed on the New South Wales State Heritage Register on 2 April 1999.

== See also ==
- Pubs in Sydney
- Australian non-residential architectural styles
