= 163–169 Sussex Street, Sydney =

Heritage-listed buildings in Sydney, Australia

163–169 Sussex Street
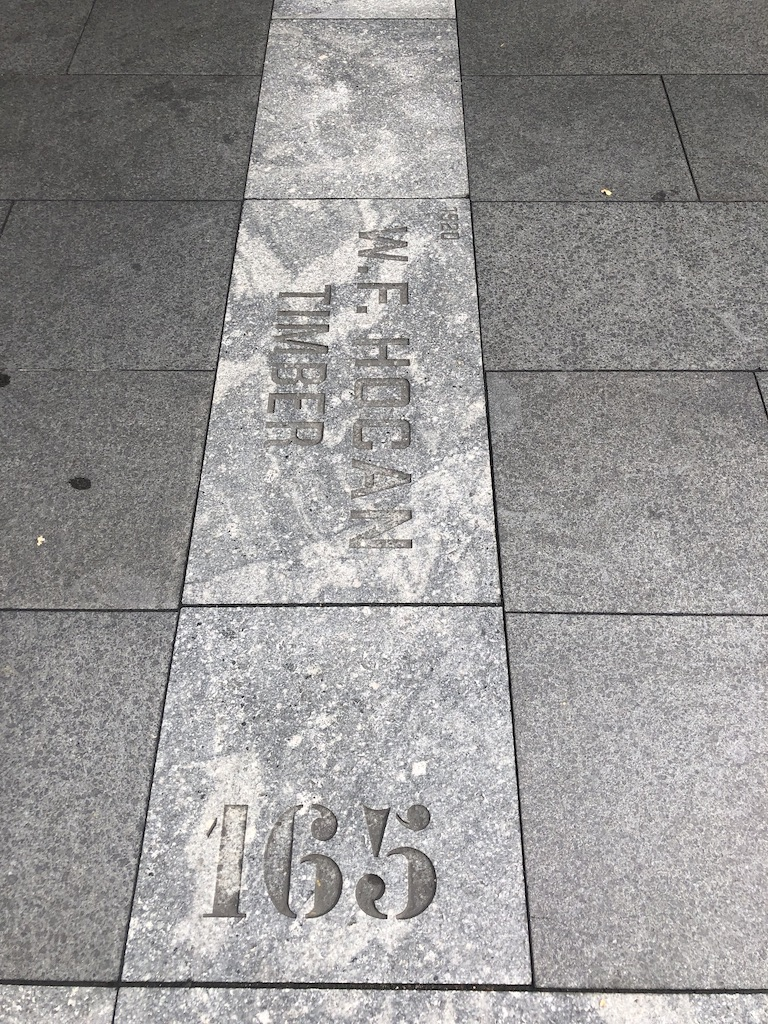
- Heritage street marker for 165 Sussex Street, pictured in 2019

- Location within Sydney Location within Australia
- 33.8702°S 151.2036°E
- Location: 163–169 Sussex Street, Sydney central business district, City of Sydney, New South Wales, Australia

Site notes
- Owner: Property NSW

New South Wales Heritage Register
- Official name: Terrace Houses
- Type: State heritage (built)
- Designated: 2 April 1999
- Reference no.: 415
- Type: Historic site

163–169 Sussex Street were heritage-listed terrace houses in the Sydney central business district, in the City of Sydney local government area of New South Wales, Australia. The property is owned by Property NSW, an agency of the Government of New South Wales. It was added to the New South Wales State Heritage Register on 2 April 1999.

As of 2019 the terrace houses were removed and the site forms part of a major hotel development, with street markers indicating some of the heritage of the area.

== Description ==
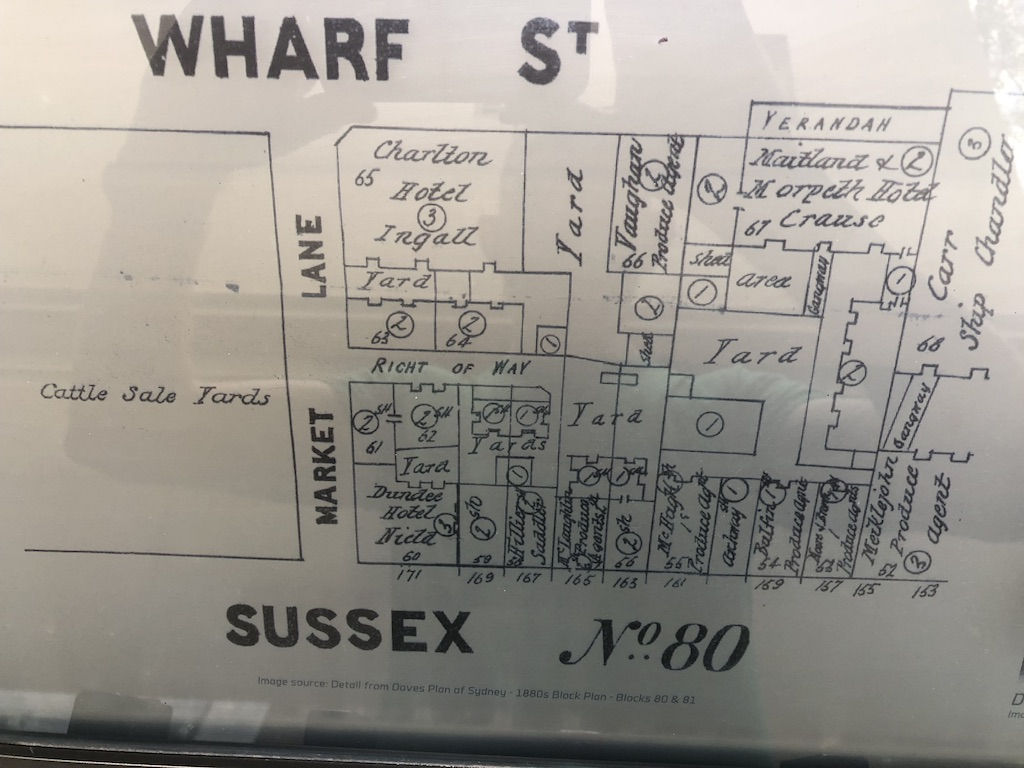
Historical map of the precinct, prior to the Hyatt Regency Sydney development.

As of 2016 the terrace houses that were previously located at 163–169 Sussex Street were demolished and made way for the Hyatt Regency Sydney/Four Point development. All that remains is a heritage marker on the driveway in the hotel forecourt.

Typical mid-nineteenth century terrace houses; painted brick with iron roof. No. 163 has largely original exterior; Nos. 165–169 have been renovated and refaced but have maintained the original scale of the facade and fenestration.

== Heritage listing ==
163–169 Sussex Street was listed on the New South Wales State Heritage Register on 2 April 1999.

== See also ==
- Australian non-residential architectural styles
