= 121–127 Sussex Street, Sydney =

Heritage-listed building in Sydney, Australia

121–127 Sussex Street
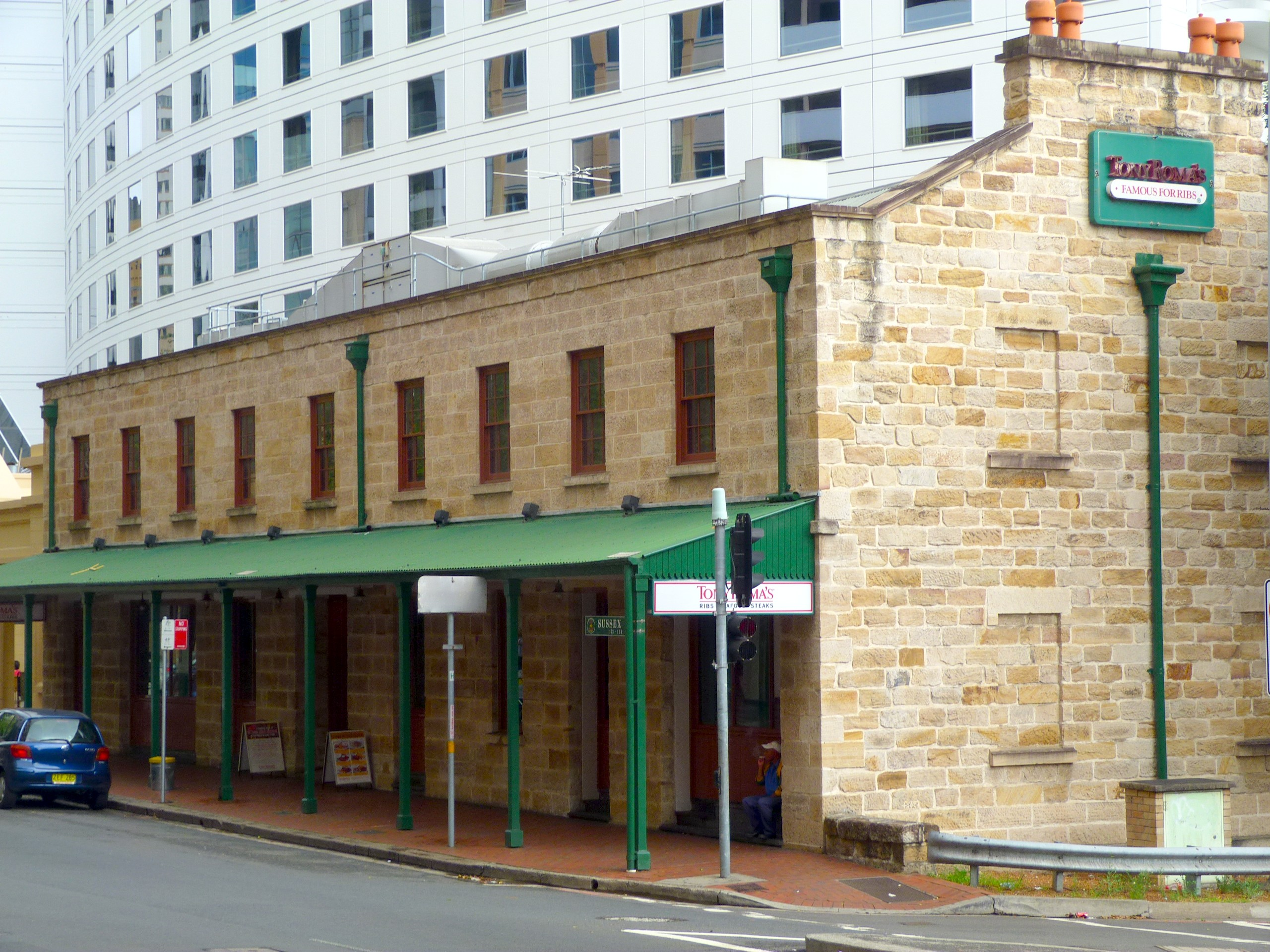
- 121–127 Sussex Street, Sydney

- Location within Sydney Location within Australia
- 33.8691°S 151.2035°E
- Location: 121–127 Sussex Street, Sydney central business district, City of Sydney, New South Wales, Australia

History
- Built: 1850

Site notes
- Owner: Property NSW

New South Wales Heritage Register
- Official name: Building; Shops/Warehouses
- Type: State heritage (built)
- Designated: 2 April 1999
- Reference no.: 412
- Type: Other – Commercial
- Category: Commercial

121–127 Sussex Street is a heritage-listed former warehouse and now commercial office building located at 121–127 Sussex Street, in the Sydney central business district, in the City of Sydney local government area of New South Wales, Australia. It was built during 1850. The property is owned by Property NSW, an agency of the Government of New South Wales. It was added to the New South Wales State Heritage Register on 2 April 1999.

== History ==
Mid-nineteenth century commercial buildings reflecting the predominant use of the Sussex Street area as storage, warehousing, and markets closely related to the wharfage in Darling Harbour.

The site for much of its history in the 19th and early 20th century was the premises of produce and commission agents. There were other businesses occupying the premises including a photographer in the 1870s. Nipper and See were long-time residents, who as well as produce stores and agents were also auctioneers. Several Farmers Co-operative Associations had their warehouses and offices on the site during the late 19th century. Goldsbrough Mort & Co had sampling rooms here during the 1890s. The buildings appear to have been modified or rebuilt just before Federation, incorporating warehouses and commercial chambers. There was a tinsmith and canister maker on the site for a short time after this. Well known produce merchants and auctioneers Livingstone and Gray, later known as Livingstone and Basham had a long tenancy on the site in the early 20th century.

The site was extensively redeveloped in 1985 and was incorporated into the Four Points Hotel. As of December 2018 the property was leased by Multiplex.

== Description ==
Built around the 1850s; painted stone and iron roof. Originally single storey to Sussex Street with four storeys at rear; sympathetic second storey added around Federation to Sussex Street elevation. Original tenants were very well known Sydney produce merchants.

=== Condition ===
As at 24 October 2002, the archaeological potential of the building is good. Settlement has occurred on Sussex Street frontage, windows not original and some shopfront panelling replaced.

== Heritage listing ==
As at 28 November 2002, an early Victorian commercial terrace that makes an important contribution to the significance of the Sussex Street Group. The large openings at street level indicate the commercial function. The first floor is a sympathetically designed addition which is also a reflection of early prosperity. The terrace has heritage significance for its associations with produce merchants and wool merchants.

Building was listed on the New South Wales State Heritage Register on 2 April 1999 having satisfied the following criteria.

The place is important in demonstrating the course, or pattern, of cultural or natural history in New South Wales.

The building has historical significance for its association with well known produce merchants.

The place is important in demonstrating aesthetic characteristics and/or a high degree of creative or technical achievement in New South Wales.

Part of the Sussex Street group, the building makes a valuable contribution to the streetscape.

== See also ==
- Australian non-residential architectural styles
