= Hawken and Vance Produce Exchange =

Heritage-listed building in Sydney, Australia

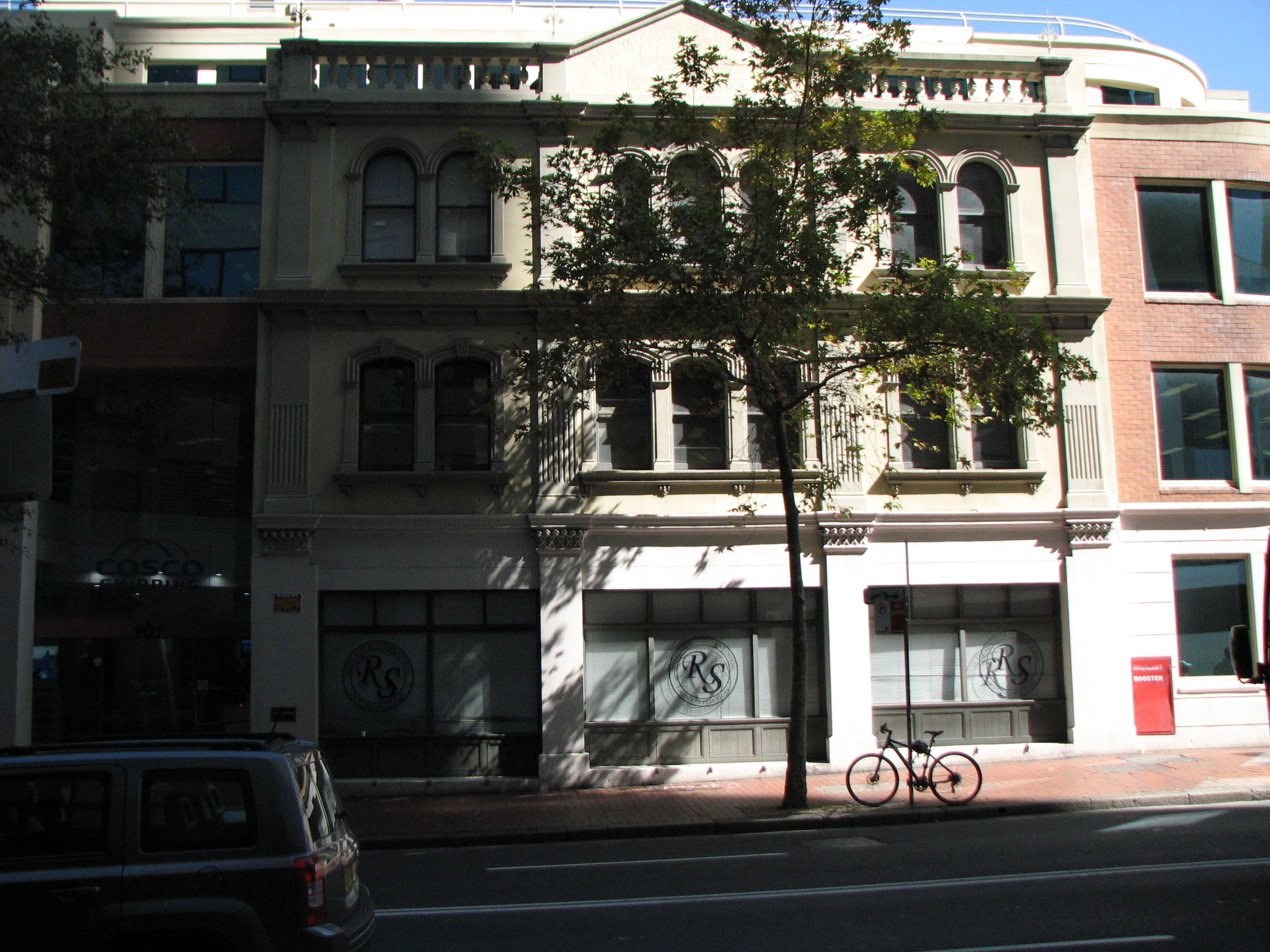
- Hawken and Vance Produce Exchange, 95–99 Sussex Street, Sydney

- Location within Sydney Location within Australia
- 33.8681°S 151.2033°E
- Location: 95–99 Sussex Street, Sydney, Australia

Site notes
- Architectural style: Victorian Free Classical

New South Wales Heritage Register
- Official name: Hawken & Vance Produce Exchange
- Type: State heritage (built)
- Designated: 2 April 1999
- Reference no.: 409
- Type: Historic site

Hawken and Vance Produce Exchange is a heritage-listed commercial building facade at 95–99 Sussex Street, Sydney, New South Wales, Australia. It was built in 1883, with the remainder of the building apart from the facade being demolished in 1989. It was added to the New South Wales State Heritage Register on 2 April 1999.

== History ==
It appears from early rate assessment books and Sands Directory entries that this building was originally No. 97 Sussex Street and was flanked by Nos. 95 and 99 which were two-storey buildings. From 1884 to 1932–33, three buildings are independently listed for the three numbers, all three owned by Hawken and Vance for most of that period. Joseph Edmund Vance and Nicholas Hawken began as produce merchants in 1868. The partnership continued successfully until Vance's retirement in 1914. Nicholas Hawken was a member of the New South Wales Legislative Council and Joseph Vance was one of the founders of the Clyde Engineering Company. The name 'Produce Exchange' suggests that it might have been more than just a warehouse, perhaps serving also as the point of contact for a variety of people, middle-men who performed a range of import-export functions. At some time between 1910 and 1920 Hawken and Vance ceased to be associated with this address and the nature of their business changed. In April 1988 Leda Holdings purchased 95–99 Sussex Street from MFN Pty Ltd for $3 million. The original building was demolished apart from the facade in 1989, with the facade incorporated into a new development.

== Description ==
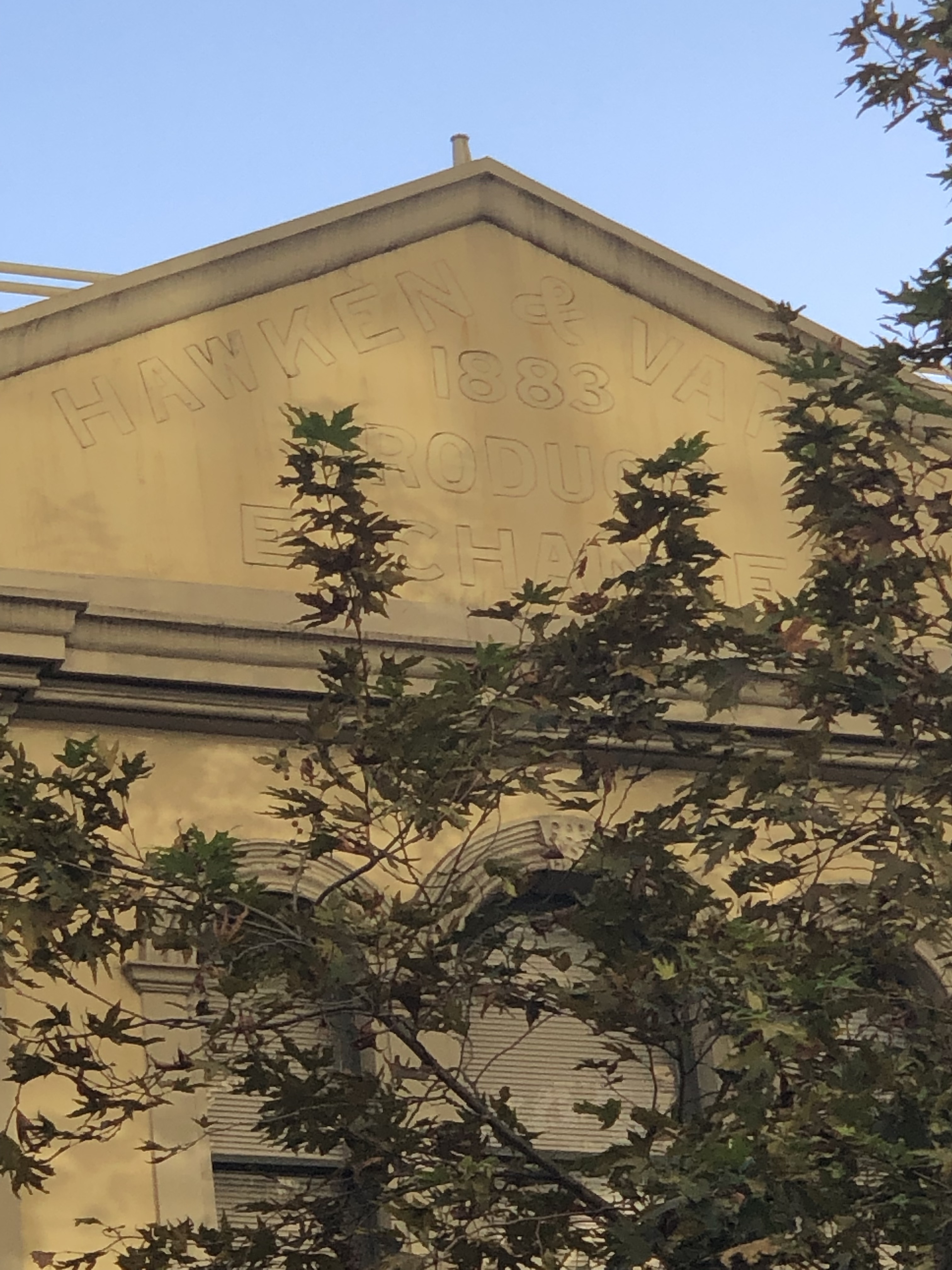
Pediment of the building, pictured in 2019.

This is a front facade only, the rest of the building having been demolished and the remainder integrated into a new development of similar height at the street front and one storey higher set back. The three-storey facade is brick, faced with stucco in the Victorian Free Classical style. It is a three-bay composition articulated by pilasters at each storey, the three levels being marked by cornice motifs, with a pierced and balustrade parapet above the side bays and a pediment above the centre. In the pediment is the raised lettering HAWKEN & VANCE PRODUCE EXCHANGE 1883. Decorative spiked urns originally crowned the parapet piers. Modern full-width windows fill the street level bays. Above, there are triple windows in the centre and paired windows in the flanking bays. All have moulded heads and sills; at first floor level they are segmentally arched with keystone motifs; and at top level they are round-arched, only the centre being keyed. The facade has been refurbished and incorporated into a development nearly four times bigger than the old building, extending from Cuthbert's building on the south to the curved corner of Slip Street on the north. The new building has an additional storey set back from the street line so as to retain the integrity of the early structure. The design of the new work is not imitative, but harmonious in scale and proportions and offering contrasts in colour and texture.

== Significance ==
The facade of the former Hawken and Vance building at 95–99 Sussex Street, has both intrinsic and contextual significance. It has significance as representative of the type of building associated with the wharves that once abounded in this area. It is an example of a mid-Victorian warehouse facade remaining in the city, with a pleasing Victorian Free Classical design in modelled stucco. Its integration into a new development is such that the scale of its context is appropriate and it reads as a contributory component of the streetscape. The facade has historic significance for its association with the produce company Hawken and Vance, whose principals were prominent Sydney citizens.

== Heritage listing ==
Hawken and Vance Produce Exchange was listed on the New South Wales State Heritage Register on 2 April 1999.

== See also ==
- Australian non-residential architectural styles
