= Dundee Arms Hotel =

Heritage-listed pub in Sydney, Australia

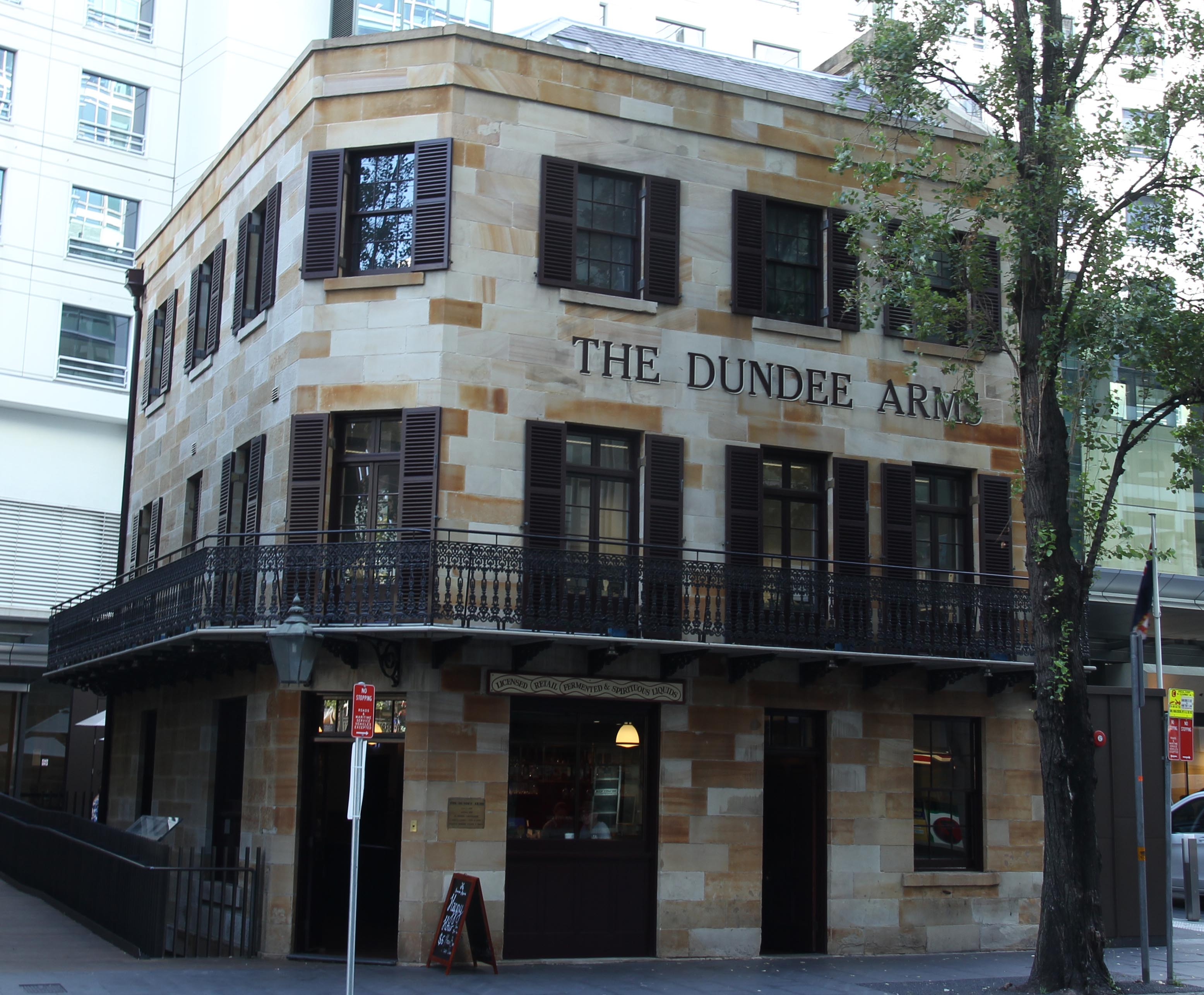
- The Dundee Arms, pictured in 2019

- Location within Sydney Location within Australia
- 33.8703°S 151.2036°E
- Location: 171 Sussex Street, Sydney central business district, City of Sydney, New South Wales, Australia

History
- Built: 1860

Site notes
- Architectural style: Victorian Regency

New South Wales Heritage Register
- Official name: Dundee Arms Hotel; The Dundee Arms
- Type: State heritage (built)
- Designated: 2 April 1999
- Reference no.: 416
- Type: Hotel
- Category: Commercial

The Dundee Arms Hotel, commonly called The Dundee Arms, is a heritage-listed pub located at 171 Sussex Street, in the Sydney central business district in New South Wales, Australia. It was built in 1860. It was added to the New South Wales State Heritage Register on 2 April 1999.

== History ==
The Dundee Arms Hotel was constructed pre-1860 and is one of the oldest surviving pubs in the area. It is a feature of the development of Darling Harbour as an overwhelmingly industrial and maritime suburb, the hotel serviced the working-class people employed nearby and sailors from the ships docked in the harbour. Throughout the 1870s and until 1888 it was managed by Thomas Ricketts, the hotel's longest serving publican. Pubs like the Dundee Arms were a focus for the local and visiting populations' social life. The hotel has been in mostly continuous operation.

It was incorporated into the Nikko Hotel (now Hyatt Regency Darling Harbour) development from 1989 to 1991; though physically standalone from the large modern hotel, it has been operated as part of the hotel complex ever since.

== Description ==
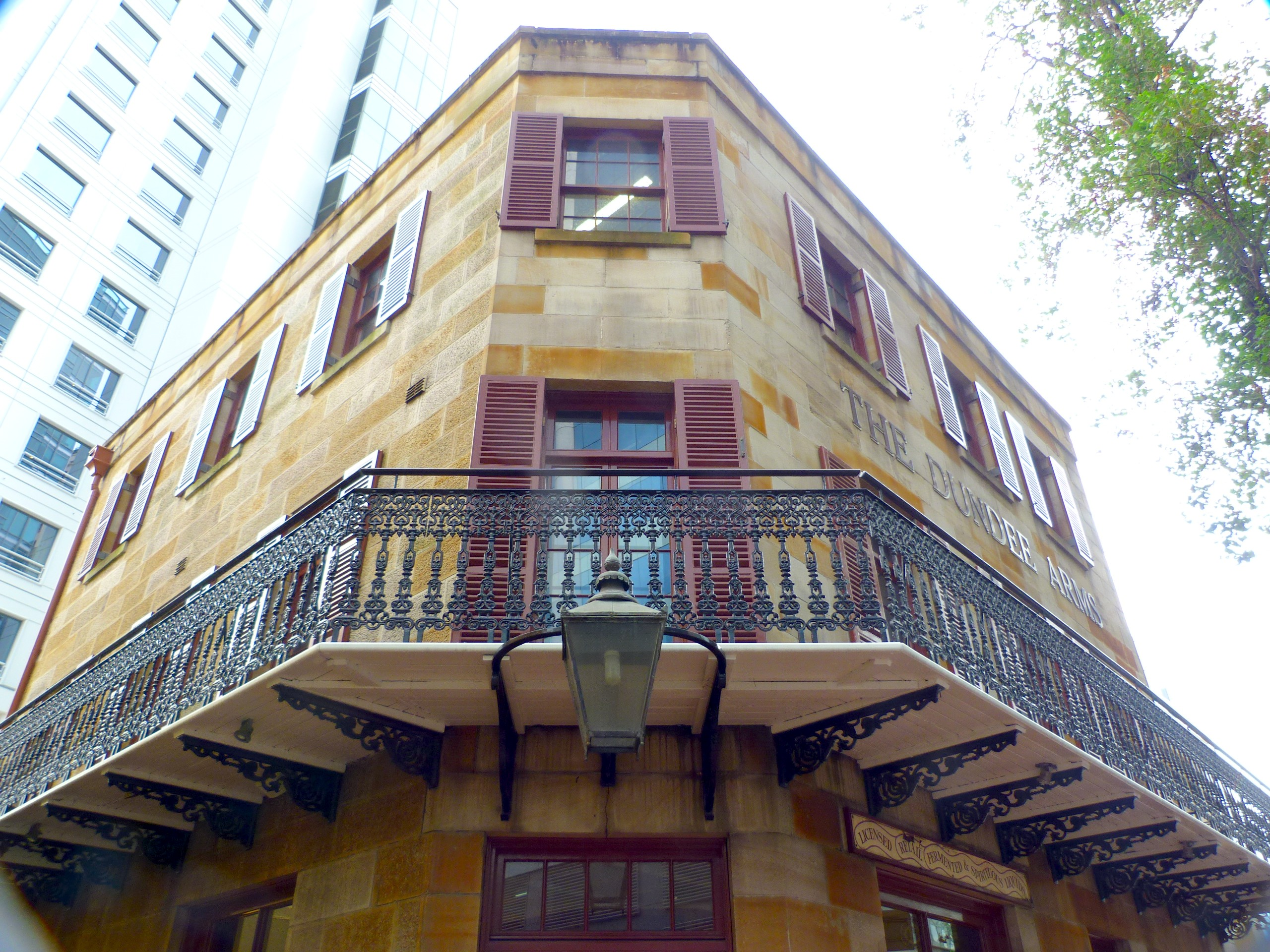
The Dundee Arms, pictured in 2010.

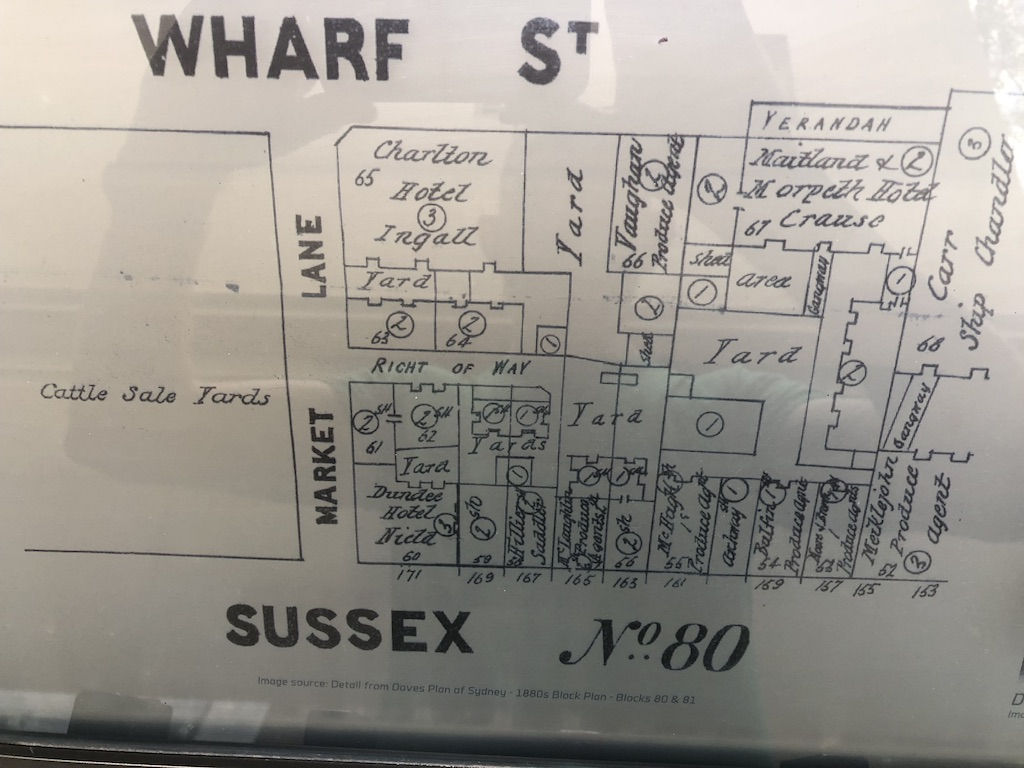
Historical map of the precinct, prior to the Hyatt Regency Sydney development.

The Dundee Arms Hotel is a typical early pub design of Victorian Regency style painted and/or rendered sandstone with slate roof; pre-1860s largely original three storey building with sound exterior and two small terraces of roughly the same date attached at the side rear facing former market lane. The first floor verandah has been removed but some original interior work remains.

The building is substantially intact and retains significant original fabric.

== Heritage listing ==
The Dundee Arms Hotel is typical of early corner pubs in Victorian Sydney, and it makes an important contribution to the significance of the Sussex Street Group. The design is an example of the Victorian Regency style. The Dundee Arms Hotel was constructed pre-1860 and is one of the oldest surviving pubs in the area. It is a feature of the development of Darling Harbour as an overwhelmingly industrial and maritime suburb, the hotel serviced the working-class people employed nearby and sailors from the ships docked in the harbour. Pubs like the Dundee Arms were a focus for the local and visiting populations' social life.

Dundee Arms Hotel was listed on the New South Wales State Heritage Register on 2 April 1999 having satisfied the following criteria.

The place is important in demonstrating the course, or pattern, of cultural or natural history in New South Wales.

The Dundee Arms is one of the oldest surviving hotels still functioning as originally designed.

The place is important in demonstrating aesthetic characteristics and/or a high degree of creative or technical achievement in New South Wales.

The Dundee Arms is an example of Victorian Regency style in a hotel building. It makes a valuable contribution to the streetscape of Sussex Street and is an important part of the Sussex Street group.

The place has a strong or special association with a particular community or cultural group in New South Wales for social, cultural or spiritual reasons.

The Dundee Arms has social significance as one of the oldest operating hotels in the area. It is representative of the type of building associated with a meeting place and place of abode for working men of Darling Harbour.

The place possesses uncommon, rare or endangered aspects of the cultural or natural history of New South Wales.

The Dundee Arms is one of the oldest continually operating hotels in the area and is classified as rare.

The place is important in demonstrating the principal characteristics of a class of cultural or natural places/environments in New South Wales.

The Dundee Arms is representative of the type of building which held social significance for the local working population and visiting sailors.

== See also ==
- Australian non-residential architectural styles
- List of pubs in Sydney
