= Corn Exchange, Sydney =

Heritage-listed building in Sydney, Australia

Corn Exchange
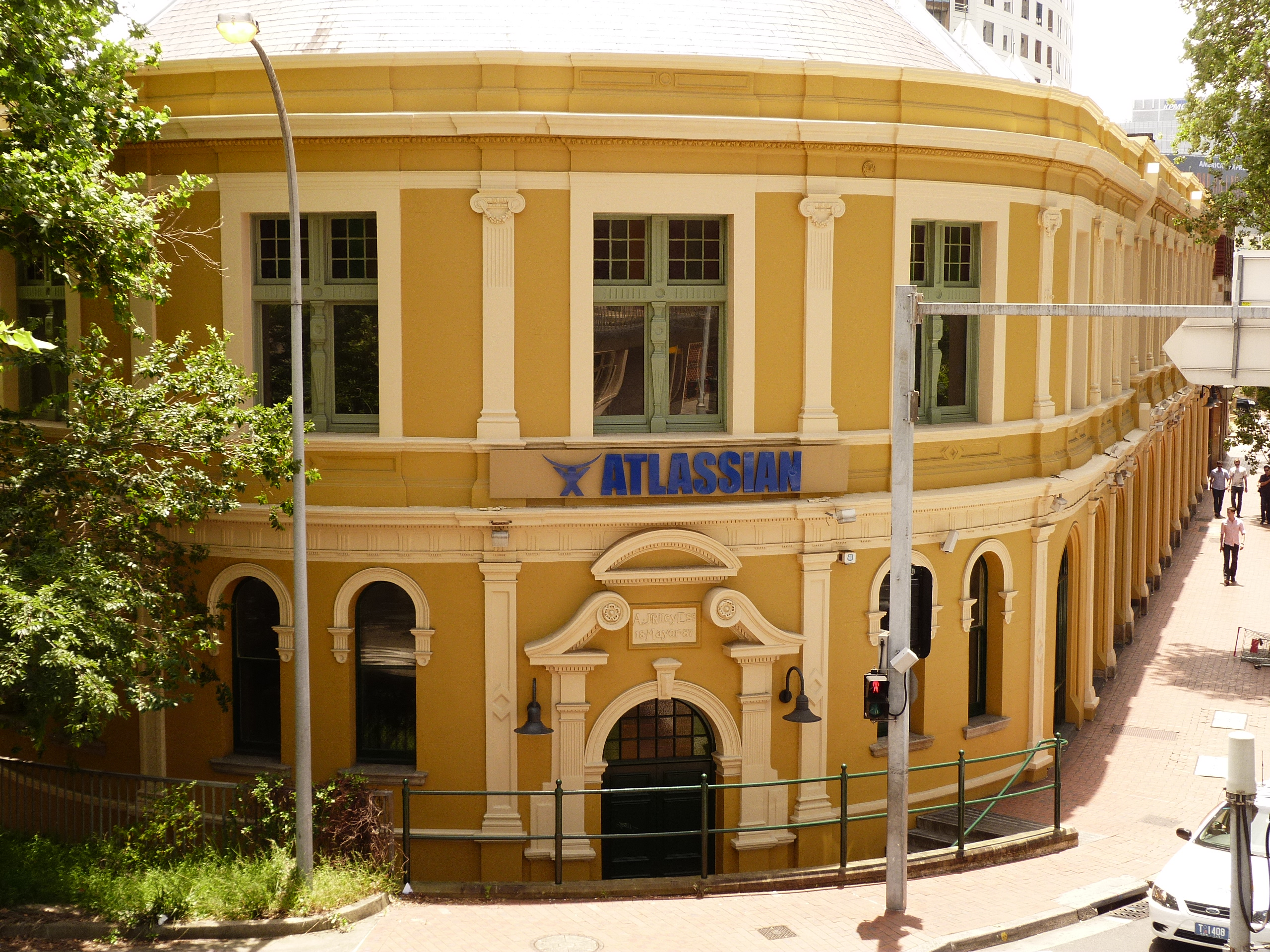
- Corn Exchange, 2010

- Location within Sydney Location within Australia
- 33.8706°S 151.2036°E
- Location: 173–185 Sussex Street, Sydney central business district, City of Sydney, New South Wales, Australia

History
- Built: 1887

Site notes
- Architect: George McRae
- Architectural style: Queen Anne

New South Wales Heritage Register
- Official name: Corn Exchange; Fruit Market; Four Points Sheraton; PACT Youth Theatre
- Type: State heritage (built)
- Designated: 28 June 2002
- Reference no.: 1619
- Type: Warehouse/storage area
- Category: Commercial

The Corn Exchange is a heritage-listed former market building located at 173–185 Sussex Street, in the Sydney central business district, in the City of Sydney local government area of New South Wales, Australia. It was designed by George McRae and built from 1887. It formerly housed PACT Youth Theatre. It was incorporated into the Nikko Hotel (now Hyatt Regency) development in the 1980s, but has been commercial office space since the 1990s. It was added to the New South Wales State Heritage Register on 28 June 2002.

== History ==
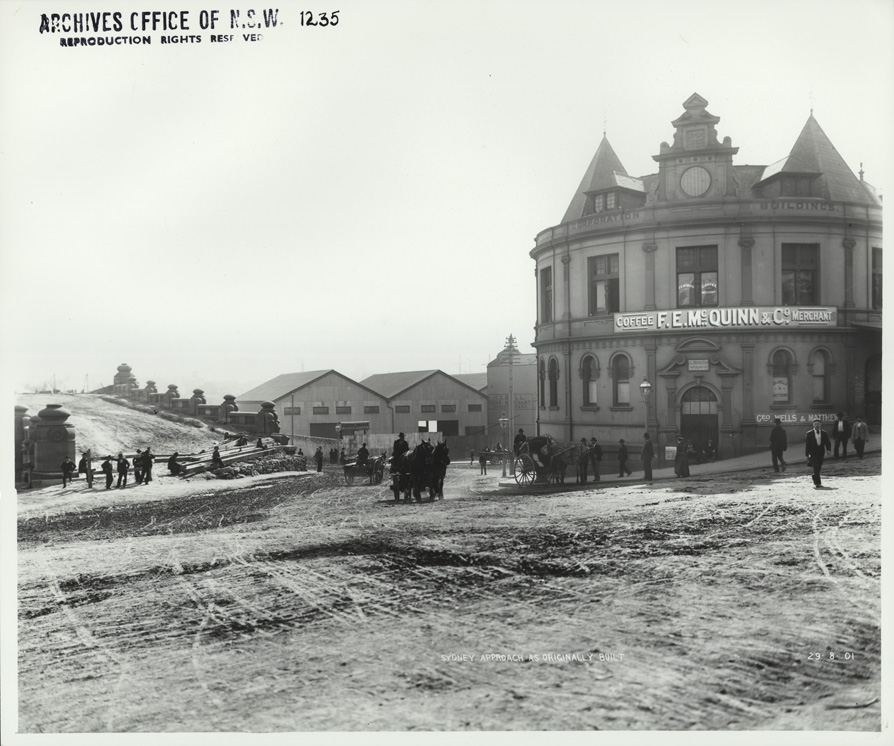
The "Corporation Buildings" in 1901, with Pyrmont Bridge at left.

The Corn Exchange building, built in 1887 on the corner of Sussex and Market Streets, is the earliest remaining market building in Sydney. It was designed by the City Architect, George McRae, who later designed the Queen Victoria Building, for use as a temporary fruit market. At the time of construction, the Corn Exchange stood at the eastern end of Pyrmont Bridge and adjacent to Market Wharf, giving it easy access for produce by road and by water. The building incorporated a German system of brick and cast-iron structural framing in an attempt to make the building fire-resistant.

The Corn Exchange building operated as a fruit market for only four years before being converted into offices with posted street-level awnings, in accord with the original design intent of the architect, named the "Corporation Buildings". In 1900, the Corn Exchange opened in the Corporation Buildings during a private attempt to establish the city's grain market in the building. As transport links away from the inner harbour improved, interest in the Corn Exchange dwindled and from 1917 a succession of commercial tenants inhabited the upper levels of the building. By 1934, the posts had been removed and the awnings were suspended. By the late 1960s the awnings had been removed altogether. The unoccupied basement was a haven for the homeless throughout much of this time.

During the 1970s and 1980s the building was in use as the home of PACT Youth Theatre (now PACT Centre for Emerging Artists), when it was the site of experimentation and innovative theatrical performances.

In the 1980s, the Western Distributor viaduct was constructed between the Corn Exchange and the wharf, and also led to the demolition of the eastern abutment of Pyrmont Bridge. The isolated easternmost plinth and lamppost of Pyrmont Bridge can still be seen behind the Corn Exchange near the intersection of Market Street and Sussex Street.

Both this building and the Central Warehouse underwent considerable alteration and suffered some deterioration of the original fabric prior to their incorporation in the Nikko Hotel (now Hyatt Regency) redevelopment of the early 1990s. Work on the Corn Exchange at that time included conservation works to the surviving significant fabric, as well as extensive alterations to facilitate its adaptive reuse as a small department store and restaurant. The roller shutters to Sussex Street openings were removed and replaced with timber-framed display windows.

In 2018, the Corn Exchange building now houses commercial offices. The building's former office tenants have included Atlassian and Wotif Group.

== Description ==
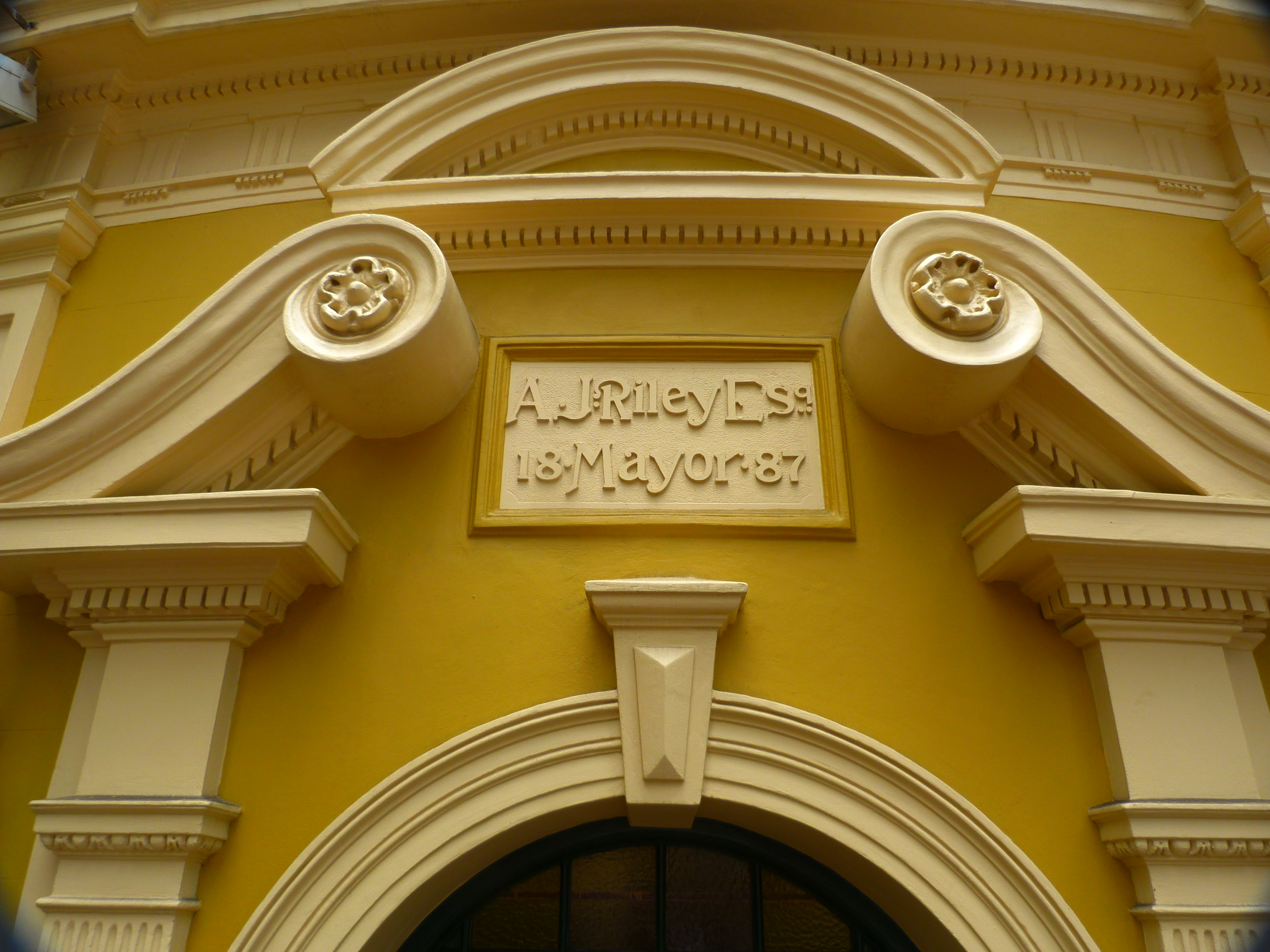
Name of the mayor, A. J. Riley, over the entrance door, 2011

The Corn Exchange Building is a stucco-fronted three-storey structure with elliptical arches at street level and a curving corner at the southern end. Two levels face Sussex Street with a basement below facing west. The slated roof of the building is an assembly of pyramidal and hipped gable shapes with a simple curved roof matching the façade to the south. The existing fixed shop-front glazing is painted white or obscured by curtains. While it has been extensively modified over the years, the building remains a good example of Queen Anne style commercial architecture.

The ground and first floors' internal framing, which consists of a mixture of brick piers and circular cast iron columns supporting riveted composite wrought iron girders, remains. The exposed roof framing and timber lining boards required considerable replacement during the 1990s conservation works. By the 1980s only scant evidence remained of the early internal partitioning of the ground and first floors. The open plan floor plate was retained during the 1990 alterations for the adaptive re-use and fitout as a small department store and restaurant.

The name of the mayor of the City of Sydney in 1887, Alban Joseph Riley, appears over the entrance door on the corner.

=== Modifications and dates ===
- 1887 – built
- 1891 – converted to offices, with posted awnings
- by 1934 – suspended awnings replaced posted awnings
- by 1960s – no awnings remain
- 1991 – major redevelopment for the Nikko Hotel

== Heritage listing ==
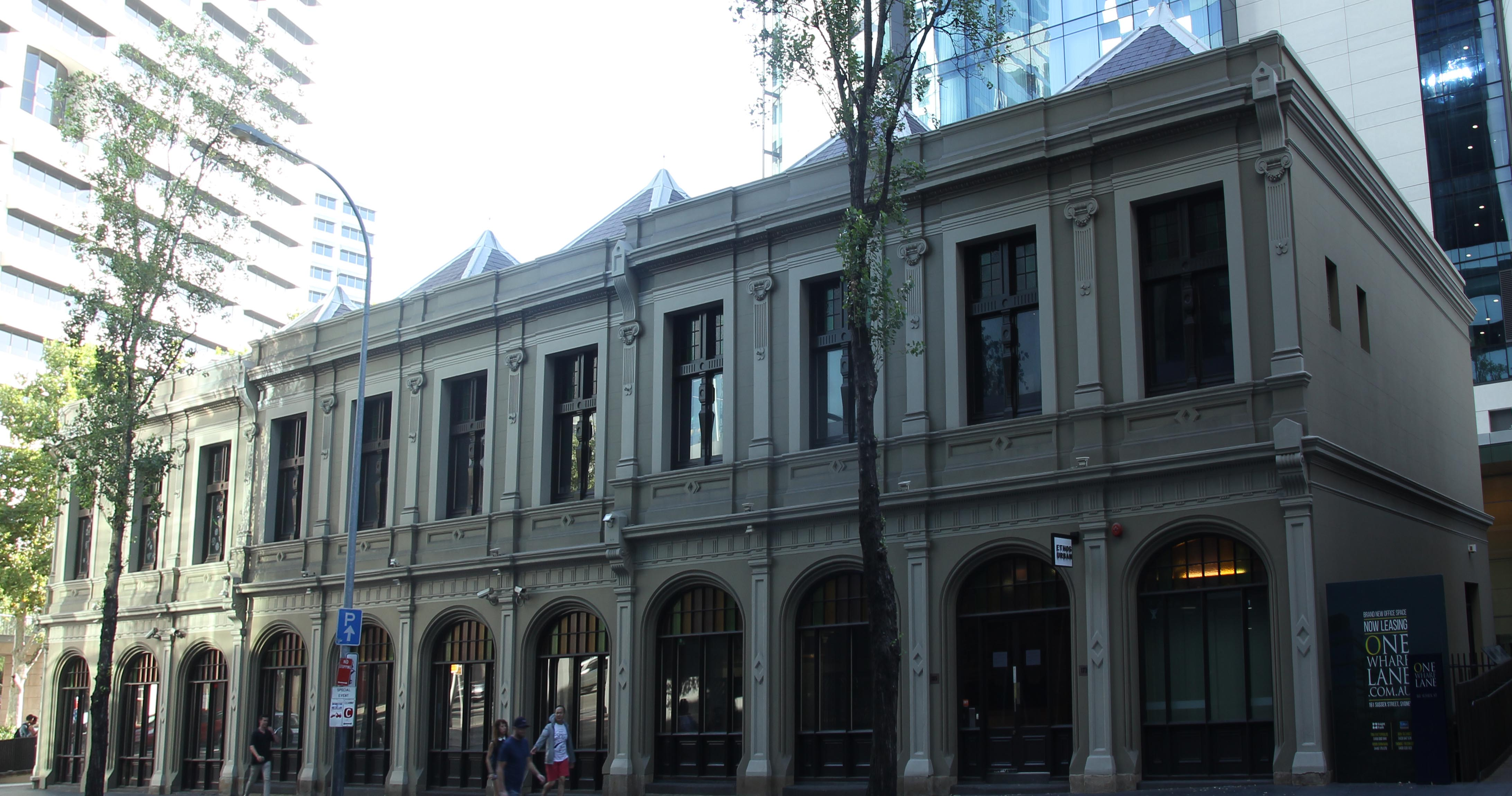
Sussex Street view, 2019

The Corn Exchange and the Central Warehouse (No. 139–151) are the last remaining remnants of this warehousing and commercial area which serviced Sydney's developing commercial and trading sector in the mid to later 19th century. These mid to late 19th century warehouse and commercial buildings, together with other remaining buildings of this era in Sussex Street, comprise a homogeneous group which demonstrate a careful attention to design, materials, and workmanship.

The Corn Exchange is the earliest remaining market building in Sydney. It was designed by the noted architect George McRae, who later designed the Queen Victoria Building. It is a landmark building; forming part of the city portal at Pyrmont Bridge.

The Corn Exchange was extensively restored, reconstructed and adapted for retail purposes as part of the hotel redevelopment in the early 1990s, but still remains a fine representative example of a late 19th century warehouse complex. It demonstrates the essential role that warehouse development has played in the development of Sydney as a commercial and trading centre.

Corn Exchange was listed on the New South Wales State Heritage Register on 28 June 2002 having satisfied the following criteria.

The place is important in demonstrating the course, or pattern, of cultural or natural history in New South Wales.

The development of the Corn Exchange and Central Warehouse Buildings demonstrates the development of commercial activities in Sydney Central Business District (CBD). Their original use as a market and warehouses, then office spaces followed by a period of neglect before an adaptive reuse development for commercial and retail tenancies reflects the evolution of built uses in this part of Sydney. The most recent use represents a conscious acceptance of adaptive reuse of existing building stock by government and private enterprise, reflecting the changing attitudes to heritage development in Sydney.

The Corn Exchange is the earliest remaining market building in Sydney. As a fruit market, and then as a private grain market it played an important part in the commercial development of Sydney in the 19th and 20th centuries.

The Corn Exchange was designed by George McRae, the City Architect, who later designed the Queen Victoria Building.

The place is important in demonstrating aesthetic characteristics and/or a high degree of creative or technical achievement in New South Wales.

The Corn Exchange and Central Warehouse Buildings comprise a sample of mid to late 19th century warehouse buildings, that together with other remaining buildings of this era in Sussex Street comprise a homogeneous group with careful attention to design, materials and workmanship. At the city portal to Pyrmont Bridge, they form a key part of an admirable streetscape. Together with a similar contribution to this part of Sydney.

The Corn Exchange is a landmark building as part of the City portal of Pyrmont Bridge. It still features an unusually richly detailed Queen Anne style warehouse facade, of a type now rare in Sydney. Its incorporation of an imported proprietary fire-resistant cast-iron structural system is an early Sydney example of developing building science being used to address safety issues.

The place possesses uncommon, rare or endangered aspects of the cultural or natural history of New South Wales.

The Corn Exchange and Central Warehouse Buildings are the last remnants of this warehousing area, which serviced Sydney's developing commercial sector. The Corn Exchange is the earliest remaining market building in Sydney. It is an uncommonly intact example of a late 19th century public building built for market purposes.

== See also ==
- Australian non-residential architectural styles
