= Sussex Street, Sydney =

Street in Sydney, Australia

Sussex Street, Sydney New South Wales
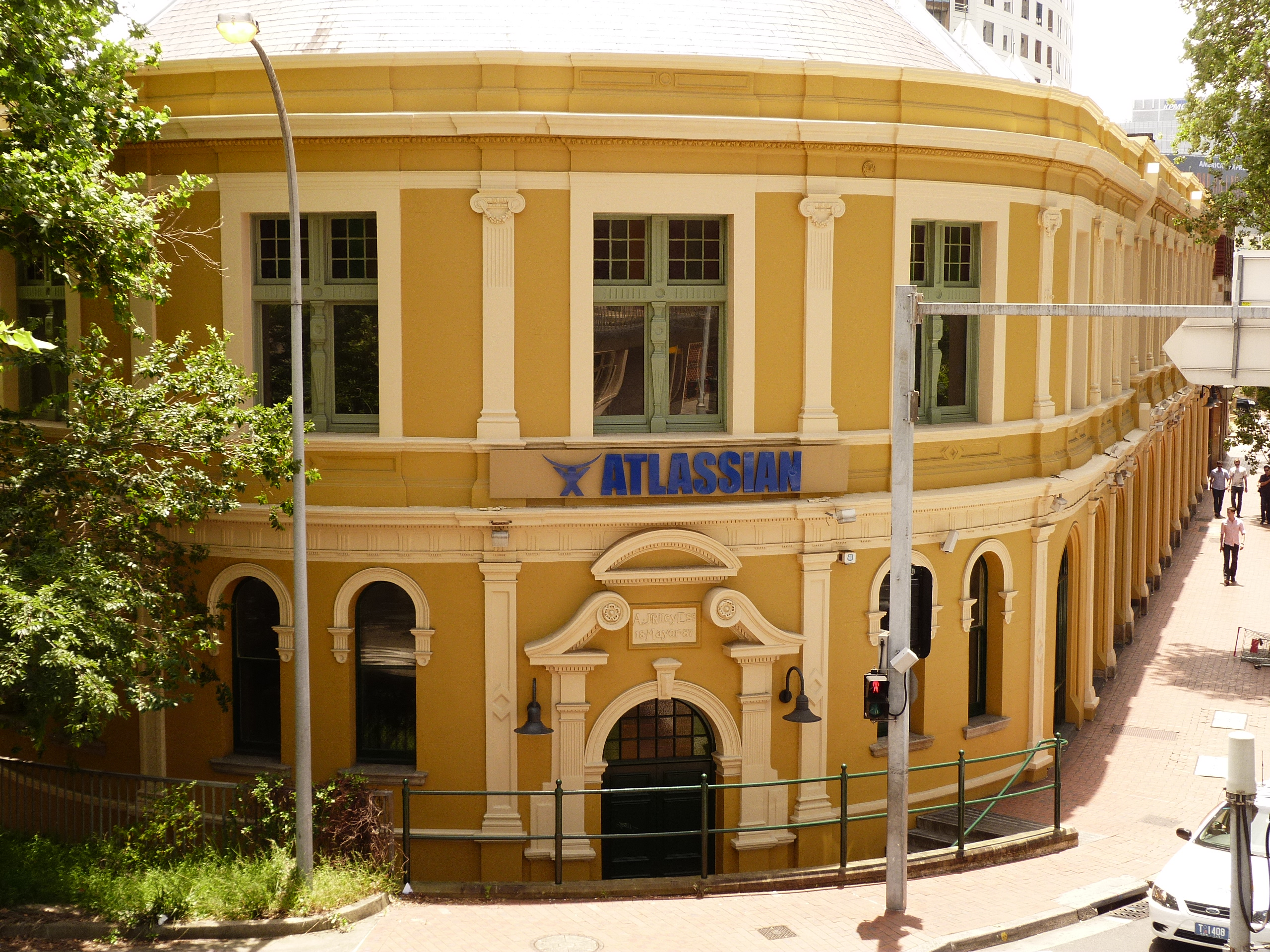
- Corn Exchange, built in 1887
- Coordinates: 33.864078°S 151.203070°E (Northern end); 33.879507°S 151.204714°E (Southern end)

General information
- Type: Street
- Length: 1.7 km (1.1 mi)

Major junctions
- Northern end: Hickson Road; Barangaroo, Sydney
- Napoleon Street; Erskine Street; King Street; Western Distributor; Market Street; Druitt Street; Bathurst Street; Liverpool Street; Goulburn Street
- Southern end: Hay Street; Haymarket, Sydney

Location(s)
- LGA(s): City of Sydney
- Major suburbs: Sydney CBD, Haymarket

Sussex Street is a street in the central business district of Sydney in New South Wales, Australia. It runs north-south along the western side of the city, between Hickson Road and Hay Street. It is in the local government area of the City of Sydney. The street is 1.7 kilometres (1.1 mi) long. It was named in honour of Prince Augustus Frederick, Duke of Sussex, the sixth son of King George III.

The street is home to the headquarters of NSW Labor (ALP) and "Sussex Street" is widely used as a metonym for the ALP in general and for ALP headquarters in particular.

== Description ==
Sussex Street is adjacent to Darling Harbour and as such has a wide range of buildings associated with the harbour activities and industries. In this respect it is similar to other streets like Kent Street and Wattle Street, whose character was largely influenced by their proximity to Darling Harbour.

The street features a large number of older, heritage buildings, alongside more recent developments like the Sheraton Four Points Hotel. It is in a part of the city that was depressed for a long time, but which has been revitalised recently.

== Heritage buildings ==
The following buildings are listed on various heritage registers:

- 20 Sussex Street: Sussex Hotel, listed on the New South Wales State Heritage Register.
- 81 Sussex Street: Bristol Arms Hotel, listed on the New South Wales State Heritage Register.
- 95–99 Sussex Street: Hawken and Vance Produce Exchange, listed on the New South Wales State Heritage Register.
- 107–117 Sussex Street: Royal George Hotel, Sydney (c. 1858), listed on the New South Wales State Heritage Register, the City of Sydney heritage register, and the (since defunct) Register of the National Estate.
- 121–127 Sussex Street (1850s), listed on the New South Wales State Heritage Register. and the (since defunct) Register of the National Estate.
- 139–153 Sussex Street (c. 1855), listed on the New South Wales State Heritage Register. and the (since defunct) Register of the National Estate.
- 161 Sussex Street: 161 Sussex Street, Sydney, listed on the New South Wales State Heritage Register.
- 163–169 Sussex Street, listed on the New South Wales State Heritage Register.
- 171 Sussex Street: Dundee Arms Hotel (1850), listed on the New South Wales State Heritage Register and the (since defunct) Register of the National Estate.
- 173–185 Sussex Street: Corn Exchange, designed by George McRae (1887), listed on the New South Wales State Heritage Register. and the (since defunct) Register of the National Estate.
- Hunter River Steamship Navigation Company building, (c. 1883), listed on the (since defunct) Register of the National Estate.
- Shelbourne Hotel, designed by Wilson, Neave and Berry (1902), listed on the (since defunct) Register of the National Estate.
- Windermere Chambers, corner Sussex and King Streets, designed by Walter Liberty Vernon and Howard Joseland, built 1880–1890, listed on the City of Sydney heritage register.
- Former Public School, designed by George Allen Mansfield (1875), later used as Flying Angel Seafarers Centre, listed on the City of Sydney heritage register.

== Gallery ==
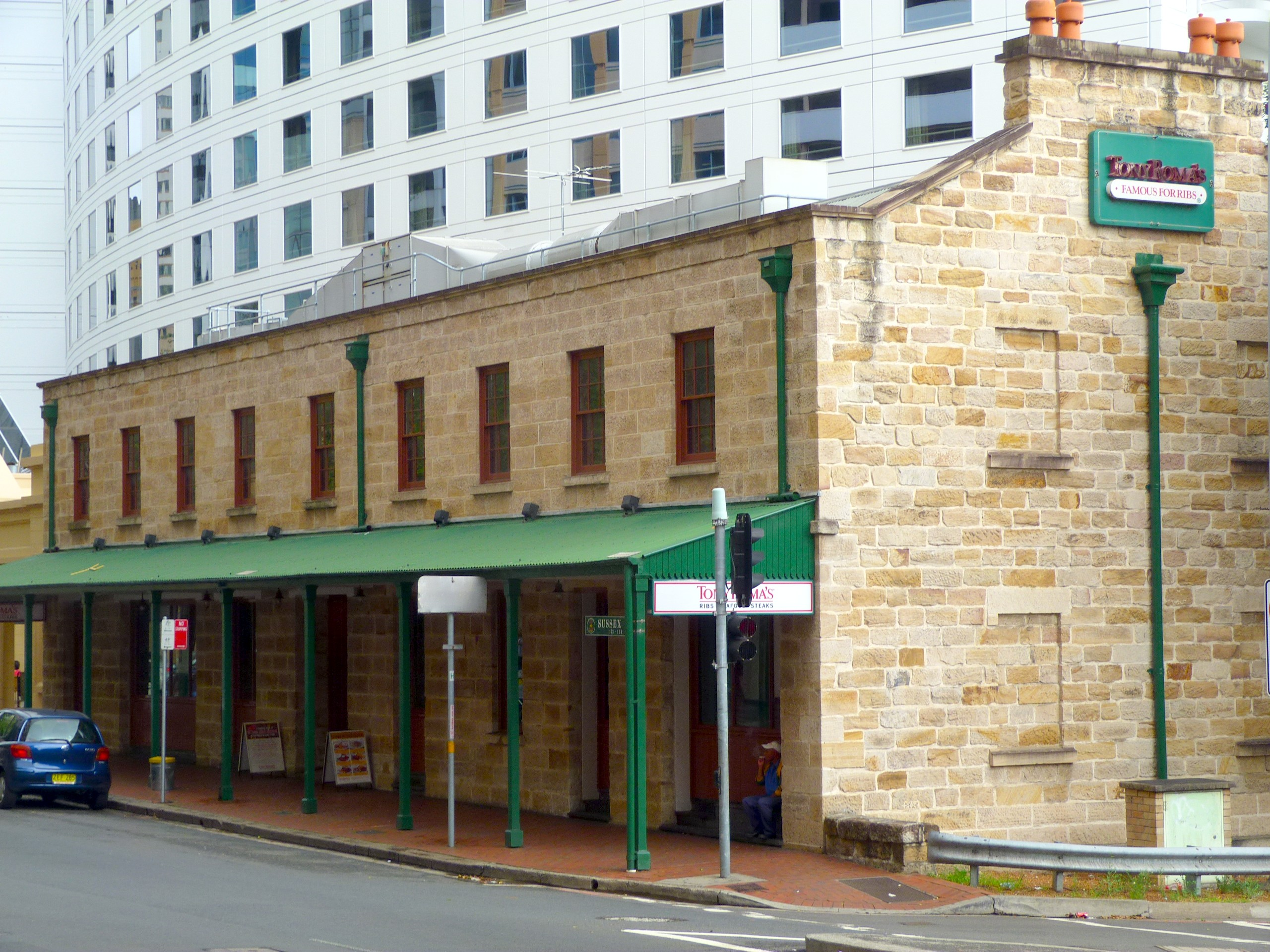
Former terrace house located at 163–169 Sussex Street

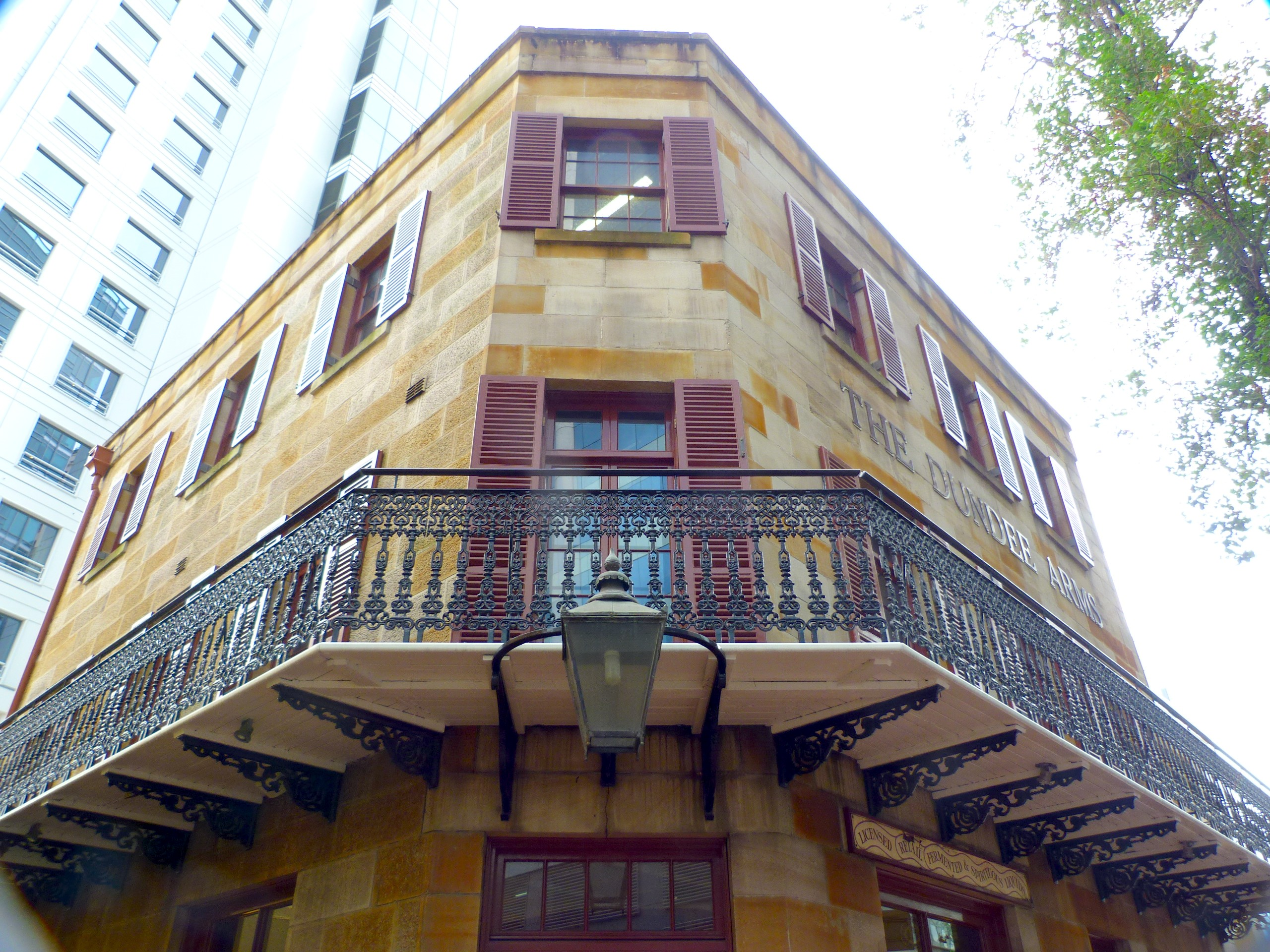
The Dundee Arms Hotel

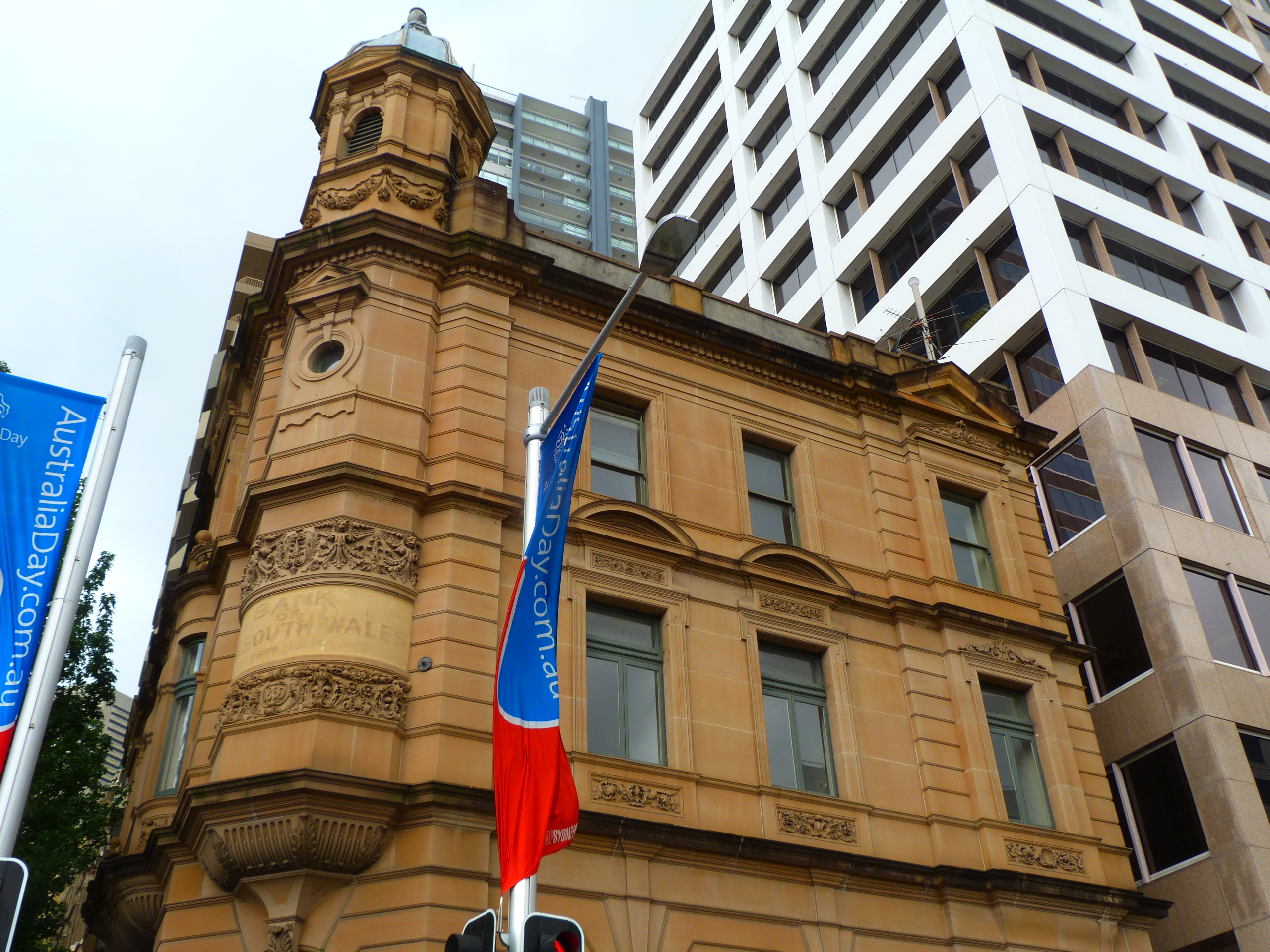
Windermere Chambers

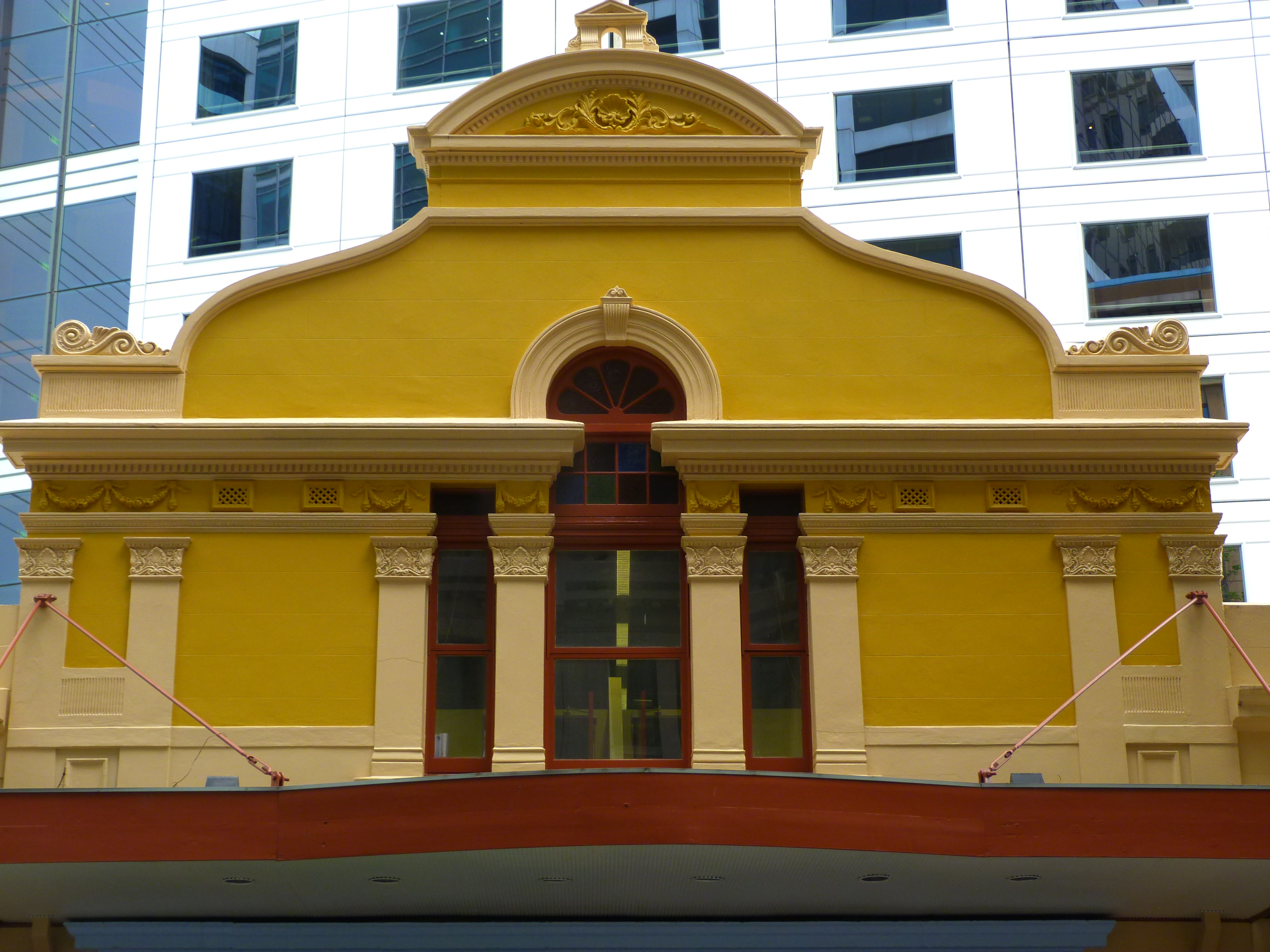
Hunter River Steamship Navigation Company

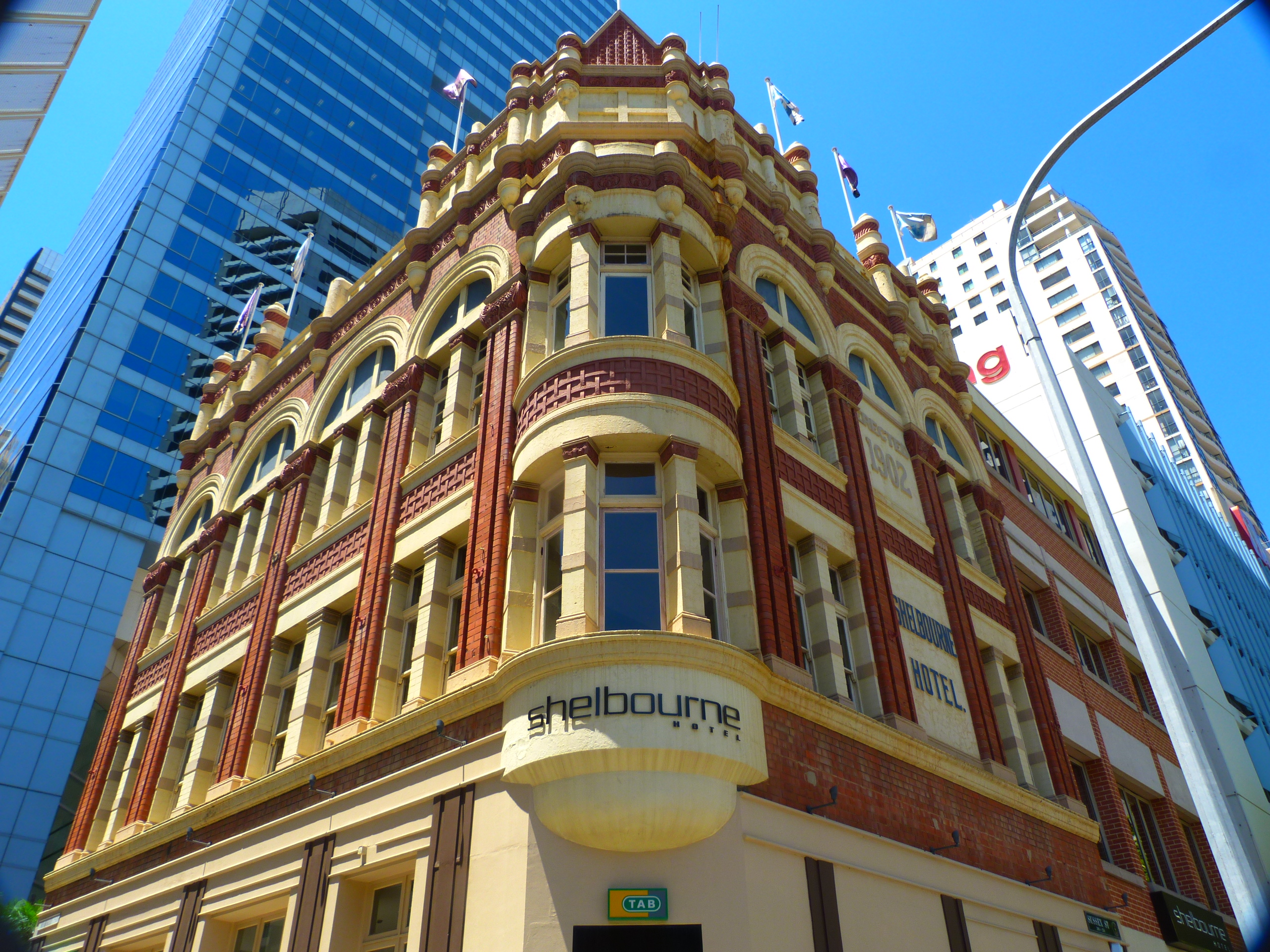
Shelbourne Hotel

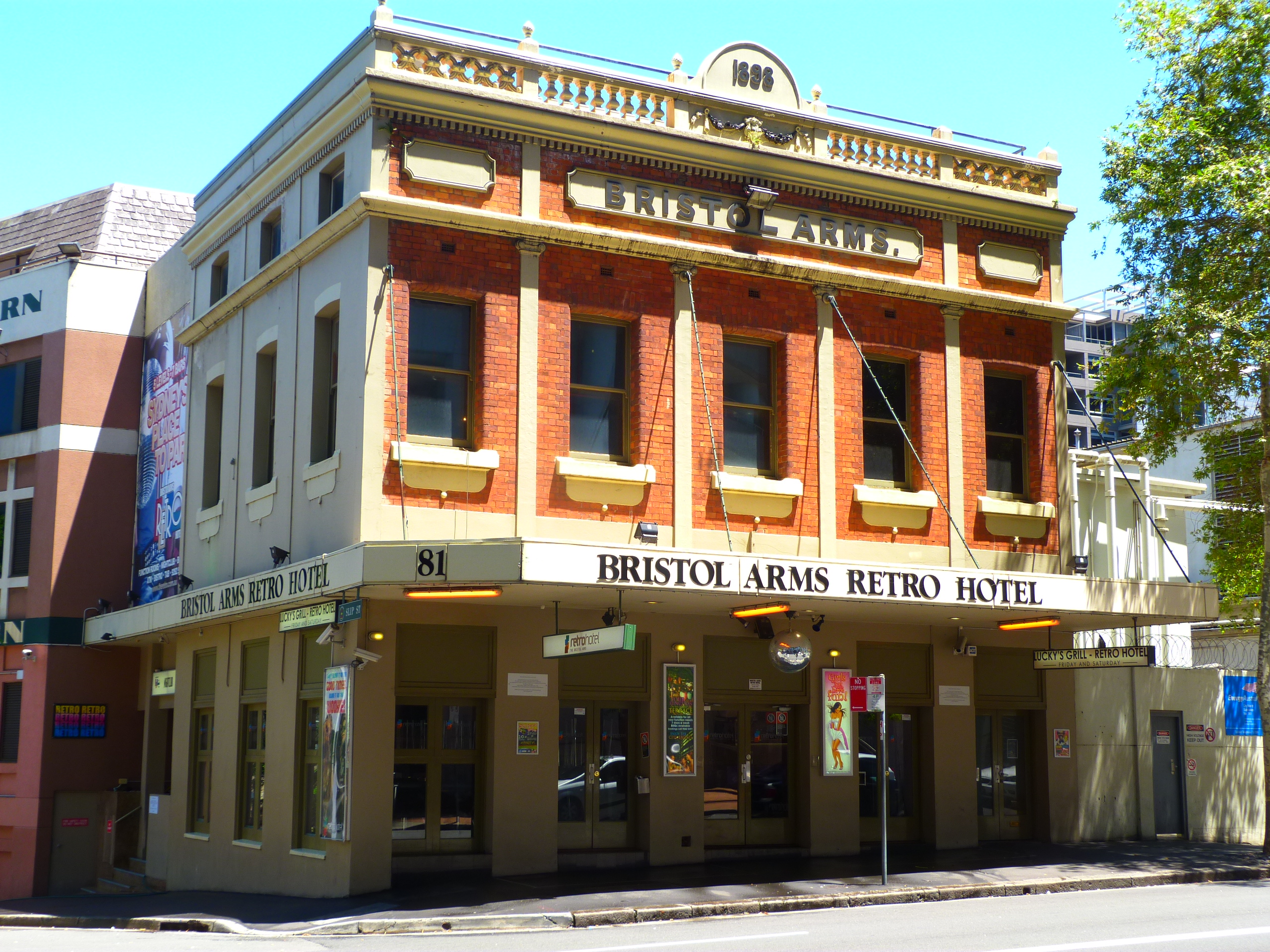
Bristol Arms Hotel

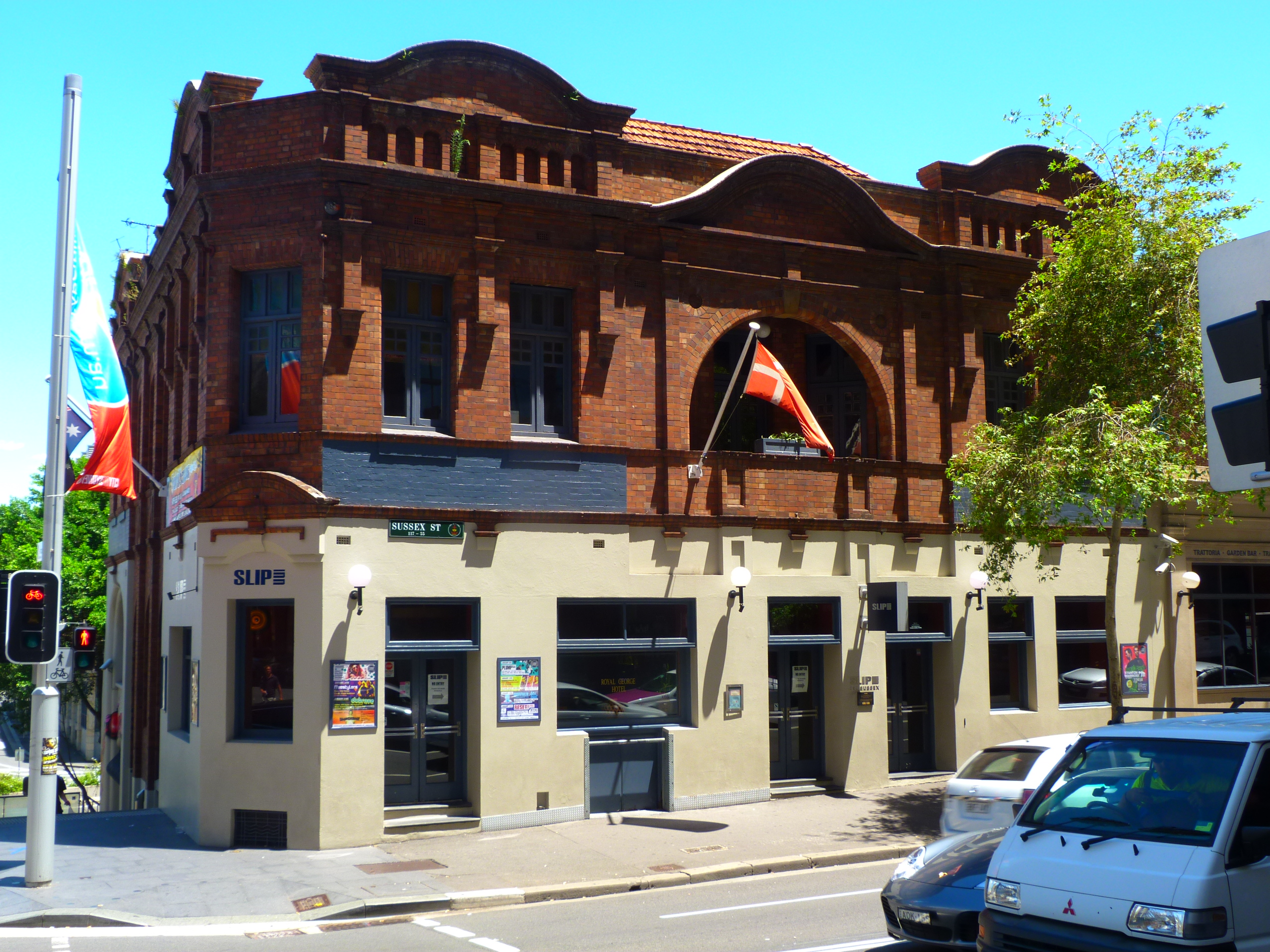
Royal George Hotel

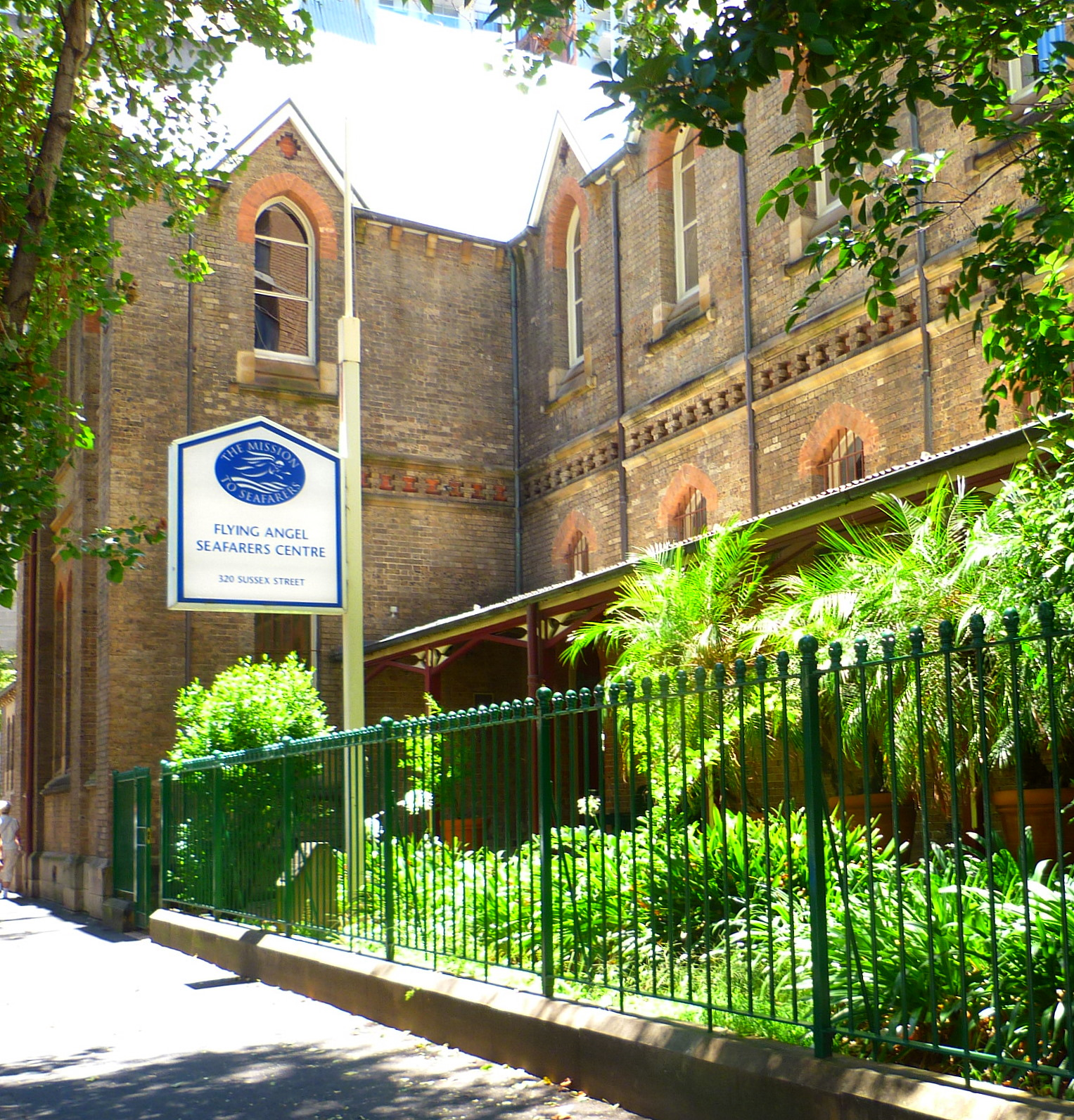
Former public school

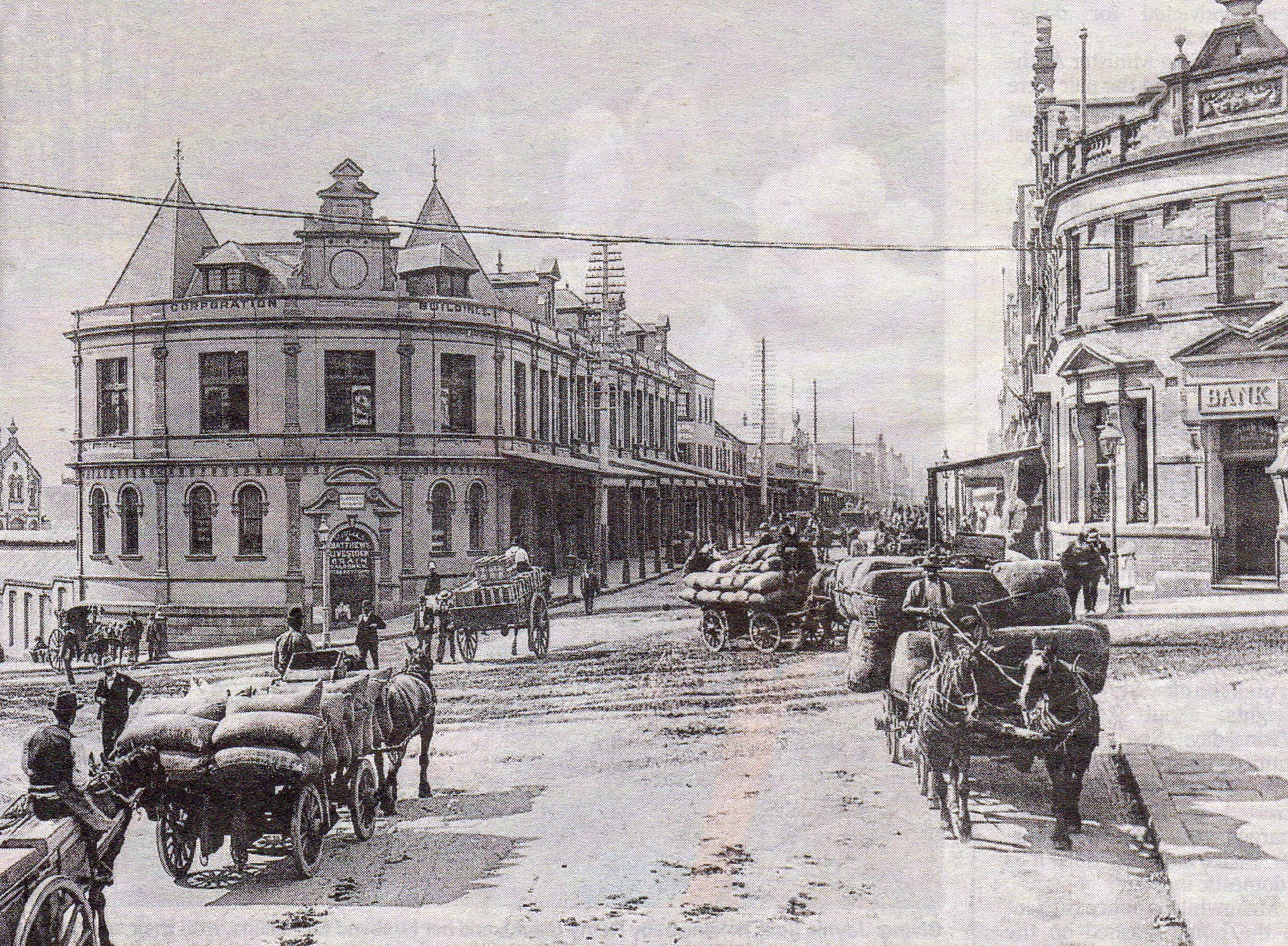
Archival shot of Sussex Street with the Corn Exchange on the left

== See also ==
- Sydney central business district
