= Ewenton =

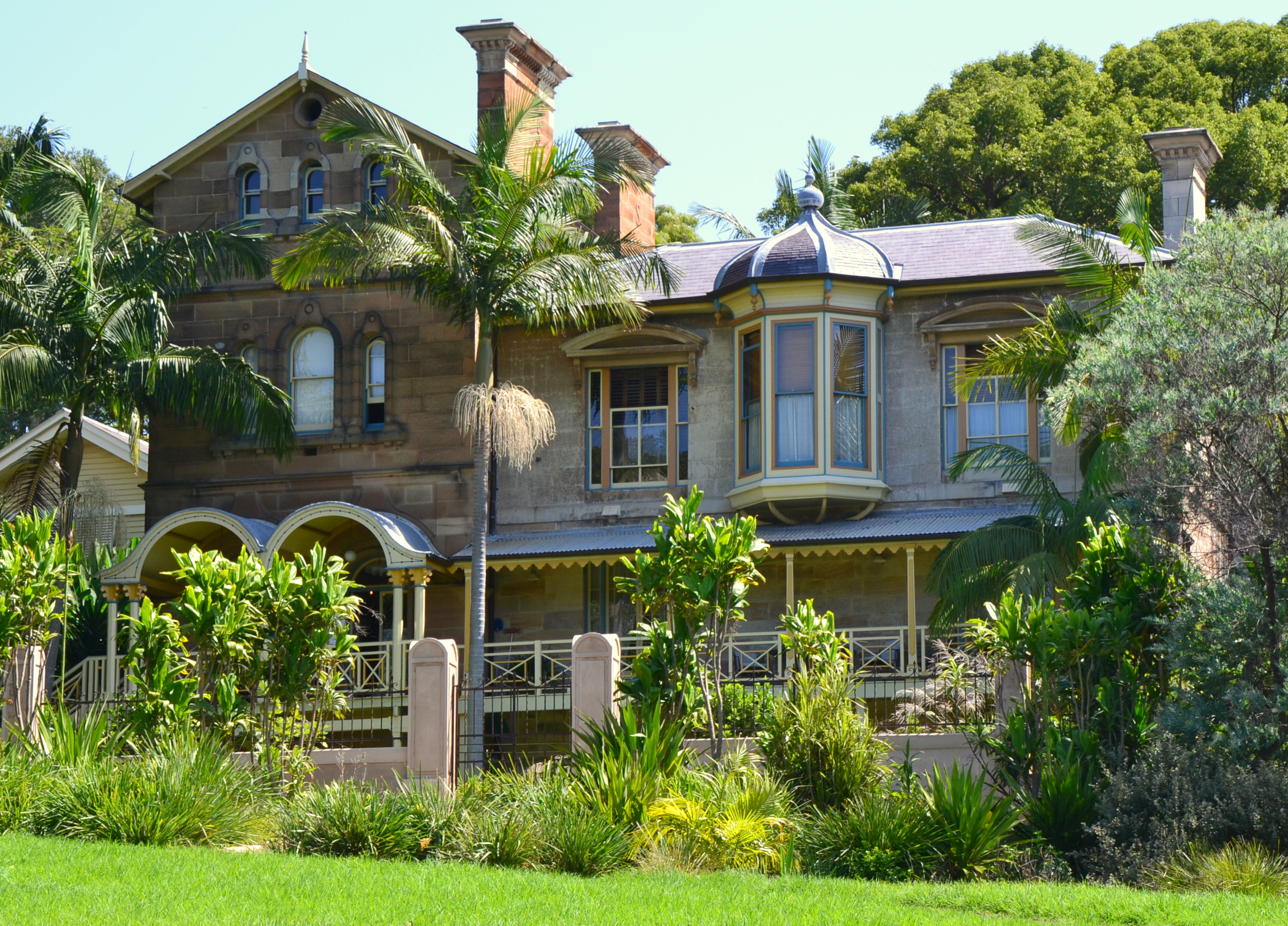

- Location within Sydney Location within Australia
- 33.8593°S 151.1893°E
- Location: 1 Blake Street, Balmain, Inner West Council, Sydney, New South Wales, Australia

History
- Built: 1854–1872

Site notes
- Architect: James McDonald

New South Wales Heritage Register
- Official name: Ewenton; Blake Vale
- Type: state heritage (complex / group)
- Designated: 2 April 1999
- Reference no.: 197
- Type: House
- Category: Residential buildings (private)

Ewenton is a heritage-listed residence at 1 Blake Street, Balmain, Inner West Council, Sydney, New South Wales, Australia. It was designed by James McDonald and built from 1854 to 1872. It is also known as Blake Vale. It was added to the New South Wales State Heritage Register on 2 April 1999.

== History ==
Ewenton's land (a larger section bounded by Adolphus Street in the west, Darling Street in the north, Johnston's Bay in the south and Sandy Bay in the east) was bought at auction in 1837 by Robert Blake, from Professor Gilchrist. Blake was Quartermaster Sergeant in His Majesty's 17th Regiment of Foot soldiers, who chose a civil career instead. He was appointed to the NSW Sheriff's Office in 1835, and made under sheriff of the colony on 1 July 1837. Blake's scheme on his estate was to build a number of houses one at a time on varying sized blocks of his land to bring in rental income, along with Darling Street buildings.

Ewenton's house was originally constructed for Robert Blake in 1854–1855 as "Blake Vale", a simple single-storied colonial house with a part basement (probably with an attic roof) on the Johnston's Bay side of the property. Blake moved in during December 1854 after the birth of his first son, D'Arcy Stephen, who died on 12 June 1855 at seven months. Blake sold the property in October 1856, moving back to (another of his houses) Mount Shamrock (8, 8a Ewenton Street).

The property was bought in 1856 by Major Ewen Wallace Cameron, a successful businessman and partner in Thomas Sutcliffe Mort & Co. in charge of wool consignments, squatting accounts and pastoral finance. Cameron also bought other adjoining properties off Blake (with his fluctuating finances) in 1860 and 1861. The 13 lots were entered from Darling Street, Adolphus Street and the entry roadway called Wallscourt Avenue. The name became Ewenton Street after Cameron bought Blake Vale. Blake had only created one other road, Blake Street. 9 of Cameron's 12 children to his wife Sophia Usher (b. 1830 in Mauritius, of a father said to have been secretary to Lord Minto, former Governor-General of India) were born at Ewenton. Mrs Cameron's origins and possible exotic tastes may explain the style of the upper floor bay window.

In 1860 to accommodate his growing family Cameron engaged Balmain architect James McDonald to add an elaborate entrance portico and stone upper storey with slate roof to Blake Vale, with bayed and pedimented windows in Victorian Simplified Classical style, providing panoramic views of the city of Sydney. It seems that the ground floor and basement incorporated Blake Vale. Cameron named the house "Ewenton". The upper storey had a bay window of singular appearance. The new addition contained two large rooms with views of the bay: three smaller rooms were located above the entrance side of the house.

The house was substantially extended in different stages 1860 & 1872. The architect for stages 2 & 3 (1860, 1872) was James McDonald, (1814-1902).

The 1872 extensions (a three-storey wing in stone with slate roof, with basement on the south side of the house) to accommodate Cameron's growing family were in a robust high Victorian style. The massive stone four-storey exterior is heavily articulated in a flat bas-relief decoration around the windows. The high quality stonework has unusual detailing, heavily outlined window openings with curious tops, not like anything from McDonald's other work, and possibly influenced by the Cameron family's travels overseas (in 1886-8). Although the continuous window sills can be found in McDonald's other work in Balmain, the stone window architraves and centre-holed "top knots" are extremely rare in Australian architecture

Ewenton was entered through impressive gates at the end of Blake Street. Carriages turned south inside the gates and followed a high level driveway around the south side of the house to stables and coach house on the lower part of the site. A sharp turn back near the 1872 wing allowed carriages to arrive at the portico. Pedestrian access was down a flight of steps in line with the main gate then by curving path to the entrance portico. Steps and a central path, at right angles to the house, led back up the driveway. Cameron retained McDonald to see to the driveway, erection of retaining walls, and general ground improvements. A photograph after 1872 showed Cameron also had a wharf, slipway and boatshed below.

The house is of post-Colonial, Italianate classical and rustic Italianate styles in parts.

Cameron died at Ewenton in 1876. By the terms of his will the house remained the family home and rental properties were to be sold off. His widow Sophia died in 1878. The older daughters had all reached 21 before the property settlement took place in 1878. Including reclamation of the waterfront the total property now measured a little more than 9 acres.

The Cameron trustees subdivided the land into two sections, one either side of Ewenton Street. They had gained permission from the Hunt family to extend Ewenton Street south to join Grafton Street, making access south to houses more easy and making the Cameron lots more attractive for sale. New streets with family names were created on the Cameron land: Wallace and Charles Street. Not counting Ewenton's own land, Section A east of Ewenton Street was divided into four lots to contain houses already built by Blake: Shannon Grove, Mt. Shamrock, Maryville, Wallscourt Lodge, and a fifth lot being the latter's front garden. Land to the west of Ewenton Street also went on the market, along with other Cameron lands, in all the estate encompassing "13 family residences and shops", ten acres of unsubdivided land on Iron Cove and four acres at Taylor's Bay, Bradley's Head.

Johanna Cameron, wife of John Cameron, commission agent, bought Ewenton in March 1879. John Cameron (not a son of E. W. Cameron) was mayor of Balmain in 1883 and 1884 and lived at Shannon Grove until the end of the 1880s.

After the Trustees sold off the lots in sections A & B, Ewenton still remained the family home for a few years. Following Sophia's death, daughter Barbara Nail cared for the family. In 1880 eldest son George became the head of the family. Mrs Nail died in 1890 at Ewenton, aged 78. That year the surviving Camerons moved to Lerna, 1 Ballast Point Road, home of daughter Julian (third child) and her husband John Waugh.

Ewenton was left vacant in 1891 but in 1892 Mrs Stainger converted it to a boarding house and was there until 1893. It was empty for a couple of years until 1896 when the Bethany Deaconess Institution took occupancy. John Harper was there from 1897 to 1898, George Lawson from 1899 to 1905, and Madame Bovin from 1906 to 1913. Sitting on just under 2 acres, Ewenton was conveyed to Walter Henry Holt, squatter, Queensland, and Alfred Edmund Jaques, Sydney solicitor, in 1886. A number of transfers of title followed in 1891 and 1896. It became a family home again when sold to Henry Brisbane Swan of Swan Brothers, timber merchants of Abattoir Road (now Lilyfield Road), Rozelle in 1911.

The increasing pollution of Rozelle Bay by the Glebe Island abattoir, impending reclamation of the bay and resumption of Swan's original timber yard there for the Rozelle goods railway, were probably factors in his decision to buy Ewenton. He expanded his business by opening a timber yard on the waterfront (later Grafton Street), south of Ewenton, in 1913. Swan was fastidious and saw to it that the yard and Ewenton's garden were kept quite separate. He moored his sailing and motor boats at the foot of the garden. Swan was the mayor of Balmain in 1893, 1894 and 1914–1915.

The garden had a well sited in the "top garden" on the entrance side of the house, at the foot of a great English oak tree. The well was lined with stone, and was very likely a survivor of the Blake Vale days. He and his wife lived in the 1860s wing, keeping the 1872 wing as studies, one on each of the three levels. The old kitchen area and butler's pantry in the basement of the 1860 wing had become a cellar. The long row of servant bells and cords could still be seen in the 1920s. Son Lyle was a barrister, but took over the timber business on his father's death in 1926. Lyle was mayor of Balmain in 1929–1931.

The Swan family were to own Ewenton until 1950. In 1951 it was purchased by Dickson Primer & Co., P/L, who expanded Swan's timber business on the property. Dickson Primer built a large shed alongside Ewenton and used the house as a store building. Its condition deteriorated. The site was rezoned residential in 1980.

In 1980 after neglect and vandalism (the bay window and verandah were demolished, cedar joinery and fittings plundered) the house caught fire, gutting the 1850s section and partially destroying the roof. The 1872 section was saved by prompt local fire brigade action.

Following a long period (when it was used as an industrial and storage site (the house was used for storing records), c. 1960-1981) as a derelict industrial site, it was restored as a residence in 1985, as part of the Cameron's Cove redevelopment. The remaining grounds including several Victorian-period trees (figs and camphor laurels), some early 20th-century retaining walls and paths, were conserved and landscaped. The bay window was reinstated, based on historic photographs and analysis. The portico, verandah and other details were carefully conserved.

In 1985 a four-lot subdivision was approved by Leichhardt Council, along with partial refurbishment of the house, demolition of the factory building and erection of 60 townhouses, Cameron's Cove.

The property was bought by Brydeen P/L (now the Australian Centre for Languages) in 1987, which applied for alterations and additions for use as a school. This was refused by Leichhardt Council, appealed to the Land & Environment Court, and the appeal discontinued in 1989.

Dr John and Susan Yiannikas bought Ewenton in 1991 and following extensive works to the house they concentrated their efforts on the creation of a garden. Modifications to the garaging, drive and entrance made the house functional, and provided deep beds for bold plantings.

A mass of understorey planting of exotic sub-tropical perennials and heritage shrubs complements the mature camphor laurel trees. Originally planted by gardener and tropical plant enthusiast Brendan Lewis.

The garden in its current form is derived from the environmental factors the landscape now faces and the desire to have a garden suited to the period of its architecture. The garden's current direction is due to the efforts of the owners and landscape designer Myles Baldwin. Baldwin trained at the Royal Botanic Gardens, Sydney and was head gardener at Bronte House.

Interior refurbishment, further exterior restoration, installation of a basement (interior) swimming pool, and erection of a re-used Victorian gazebo in the garden, were approved in 1992.

In 1998 a new two car garage and basement storage area (converted to a swimming pool), a re-used (i.e. relocated) Victorian gazebo in the garden and new sandstone driveway following the general arrangement of the Victorian driveway were approved and built near the southern end of the 1872 wing, off Grafton Lane.

== Description ==
=== House ===
The house was originally constructed in 1854–1855 and substantially extended in different stages from 1860 to 1872, and is of post-Colonial, Italianate classical and rustic Italianate styles, with unusually interesting sandstone detailing.

The house reflects the various periods of construction and styles, including Georgian (1854), Victorian Classical Italianate (1860) and Victorian Rustic Italianate (1872). It presents as a three and four storey sandstone building to the east, water frontage. Significant features include the third storey oriel bay window, decorative timber verandah and arched windows.

Two storey (plus attic and basement) large building with hipped and gable ended slate roof has a number of eclectic features such as bay window and verandah. The house consists of Post-Colonial, Italianate classical and rustic Italianate styles in parts.

A three-storey south wing with basement is totally different to the north wing. Built in high quality stonework with unusual detailing such as heavily outlined window openings and continuous window sills. String courses boldly define the different storeys and express the diminished thickness of the stone walls as the building rises. The first and second levels feature small narrow arched double hung windows with a center-holed "top knot"at the top of the gable end.

The verandah extends across the basement level. Above, on the ground floor level the verandah extends across the facade and changes height at the heavily moulded arches of the door openings, with a double- arched curved corrugated steel roof over. The fascias of the arcaded verandah are perforated and the roof is supported on timber columns with Corinthian capitals. A criss-cross balustrade is common to both verandahs.

The first floor level east facade of the north wing has a central projecting oriel bay window with a separate conical shaped roof with large windows on either side with curved pediment type mouldings above.

Entry to the house is on the western facade. There are tall cast iron gates at the end of Blake Street. Pedestrian access is down a flight of stairs in line with the main gate then by a curving path to the entrance portico. Steps and a central path, at right angles to the house, lead back up the driveway. A long driveway leads down to the separate garage building.

The east side of the house overlooks the Ewenton Park and the harbour.

=== Garden ===
Ewenton is set amongst established gardens and features significant camphor laurel trees on the west of the house as well as sandstone retaining walls, gate potss and paths. The original (or early) and current main entry is off Blake Street, where the original sandstone gate posts remain and a section of iron picket fencing with forged spears set in a masonry base. The gates are modern. The original (or early) iron picket gates have been relocated within the property's garden.

The house's eastern front is clearly visible from adjacent Ewenton Park, facing Sydney Harbour.

The current owners, who acquired Ewenton in 1991, undertook extensive works to the house and concentrated their efforts on the creation of a garden. Modifications to the garaging, drive and entrance made the house functional and provided deep beds for bold plantings, creating a garden suited to the setting.

The garden in its current form is derived from the environmental factors the landscape now faces and the desire to have a garden suited to the period of its architecture. Entering from Blake Street, through gates that now sit in the location of the original grand entrance, you enter what appears less like Balmain and more like a private parkland.

The drive turns hard right inside the gates and follows a line set by Ewenton's original architect James McDonald. Mature camphor laurel trees (Cinnamomum camphora) bathe the drive and garden with filtered light and a hint of the harbour can be seen through their branches. A mass of understorey planting of exotic sub-tropical perennials and heritage shrubs complements these trees. Originally planted by gardener and tropical plant enthusiast Brendan Lewis, the palette of plants is suited to life under the competitive camphor laurels.

As a boundary planting Lewis used shell ginger (Alpinia zerumbet), propagated from tubers he found when clearing out decades of overgrown bamboo, privet and rubbish. The white flowers provide screening from fencing while creating a sense of depth. In the body of the garden Lewis combined drifts of shade-tolerant and flowering semi-hardwood perennials Mackaya bella and giant fan palms (Chamaedorea costaricana) and a purple form of Ctenanthe setosa. Lower on the slope these plantings are also bolstered by clumps of giant bird-of-paradise flower (Strelitzia nicolai), Justicia sp. and more ginger.

Recent plantings in the drive garden include masses of Hydrangea and specimen plantings of Camellia japonica, angel's trumpets (Brugmansia cv.s), sweet viburnum and evergreen magnolia (Magnolia grandiflora), to add colour, seasonal variation and permanency to perennial drifts and palms. Although not the original driveway surface but built in the same location, the drive passes through the garden and feels more of the garden than a thoroughfare.

At a junction in the drive adjacent to a contemporary garage designed by architect Peter Tonkin, the site's steepness becomes a significant feature. A large floating boulder opposite the garage supports a lead-roofed pavilion also designed by Tonkin for the Yiannidises. Footing it is a mass display of Philodendron x "Xanadu", a clipped Japanese box hedge and a collection of Agave attenuata. Around the pavilion plantings of cape leadwort (Plumbago capensis), Viburnum, bird-of-paradise flower (Strelitzia reginae) and day lilies (Hemerocallis cv.s) grow under a black locust (Robinia).

A circular garden supporting an urn and bordered with a dense collection of low and ground-cover perennials including beefsteak plant (Iresine herbstii), spike flower (Plectranthus ciliatus), Ctenanthe, Mercury Bay weed (Dichondra repens) marks the top of the steps to the front door and access to the lower garden. Nearby a large stone bench is a feature, built from remains of an old wall demolished elsewhere on the property.

New plantings of evergreen magnolia and Camellia have been planted around the bench and adjacent beds.

At entry level to the house a steep bank of Mexican lilies (Beschorneria yuccoides), grey sage (Salvia leucantha), green Ctenanthe, ornamental wandering Jew and rock roses (Cistus sp.) dotted with feature Michelia sp., dwarf date palms (Phoenix roebelenii) and pink angel's trumpets (Brugmansia cv.) provide colour and texture viewed from the house. Two traveller's palms (Ravenala sp.) supported by fruit salad plant (Monstera deliciosa), several Brazilian red cloaks and a frangipani (Plumeria rubra cv.) give interest.

The path leads around the house's southern side. Below the garage is the garden shed and compost area, hidden behind dwarf palms (Rhapis excelsa), ornamental bananas (Musa ornata) and a large drift of ginger which screens areas below and the adjoining residence.

The walk down this side of the house is made from recycled sandstone details collected by the owners. Adjacent to this, past troughts of rabbit's foot ferns the basement stone works contrast with timber steps added by the Yiannikas' and the edge of the harbour-front verandah, designed by Clive Lucas, replacing the original that had long ago been removed.

On Ewenton's eastern side the garden opens up and reveals its relationship to the harbour. Once the home of a sloped garden path to a reclaimed lower paddock and boat house, the older landscape has been transformed over the years to become a purposeful lawn, and the publicly accessible Ewenton Park, maintained by the Inner West Council. A mature Moreton Bay fig (Ficus macrophylla), once part of Ewenton's garden and visible in photographs from 1872, is still here today offering protection from southerly winds and the view to White Bay wharves.

Bordering the lawn to the south, Philodendron x "Xanadu" forms a carpet that rises up to a collection of Cordyline stricta, beehive gingers and rare Thai blue ginger (Dichorisandra thyrsiflora), under the shade of mature evergreen alders. Adjacent to the house are three clumps of Alexandra palms (Archontophoenix alexandrae).

=== Modifications and dates ===
- 1827+: site probably used as a quarry for stone to build a number of Blake's houses in the area.
- 1854-5: Blake Vale built, 1860 & 1872 extended as Ewenton
- 1892-1913: boarding house use
- 1950+: industrial use with adjacent shed, and house used as a store, neglected
- 1980: fire damage
- 1986: Exterior restored
- 1992: exterior restoration, installation of basement (interior) swimming pool, erection of a re-used Victorian gazebo in the garden.
- 1998: a new 2 car garage and basement storage area and new sandstone driveway following the general arrangement of the Victorian driveway were built near the southern end of the 1872 wing.

== Heritage listing ==
Ewenton has historic and aesthetic heritage significance in its external fabric and waterfront setting as one of the very few large Victorian waterfront estates in Balmain which remain largely intact, and demonstrate the changing tastes of the Victorian era. The house was originally constructed in 1854–1855 and substantially extended in different stages from 1860 to 1872, and is of post-Colonial, Italianate classical and rustic Italianate styles, with unusually interesting sandstone detailing. It retains the core part of its grounds including several Victorian-period trees (including three camphor laurels), some early 20th-century retaining walls and paths. The property has historic significance for its association with Major Ewen Wallace Cameron, partner in Thomas Sutcliffe Mort & Co., and one of Balmain's leading citizens, and architect (of 1860 and 1872 additions) James McDonald, early Balmain identity.

Ewenton was listed on the New South Wales State Heritage Register on 2 April 1999.
