= Balmain Hospital =

- Sydney Local Health District
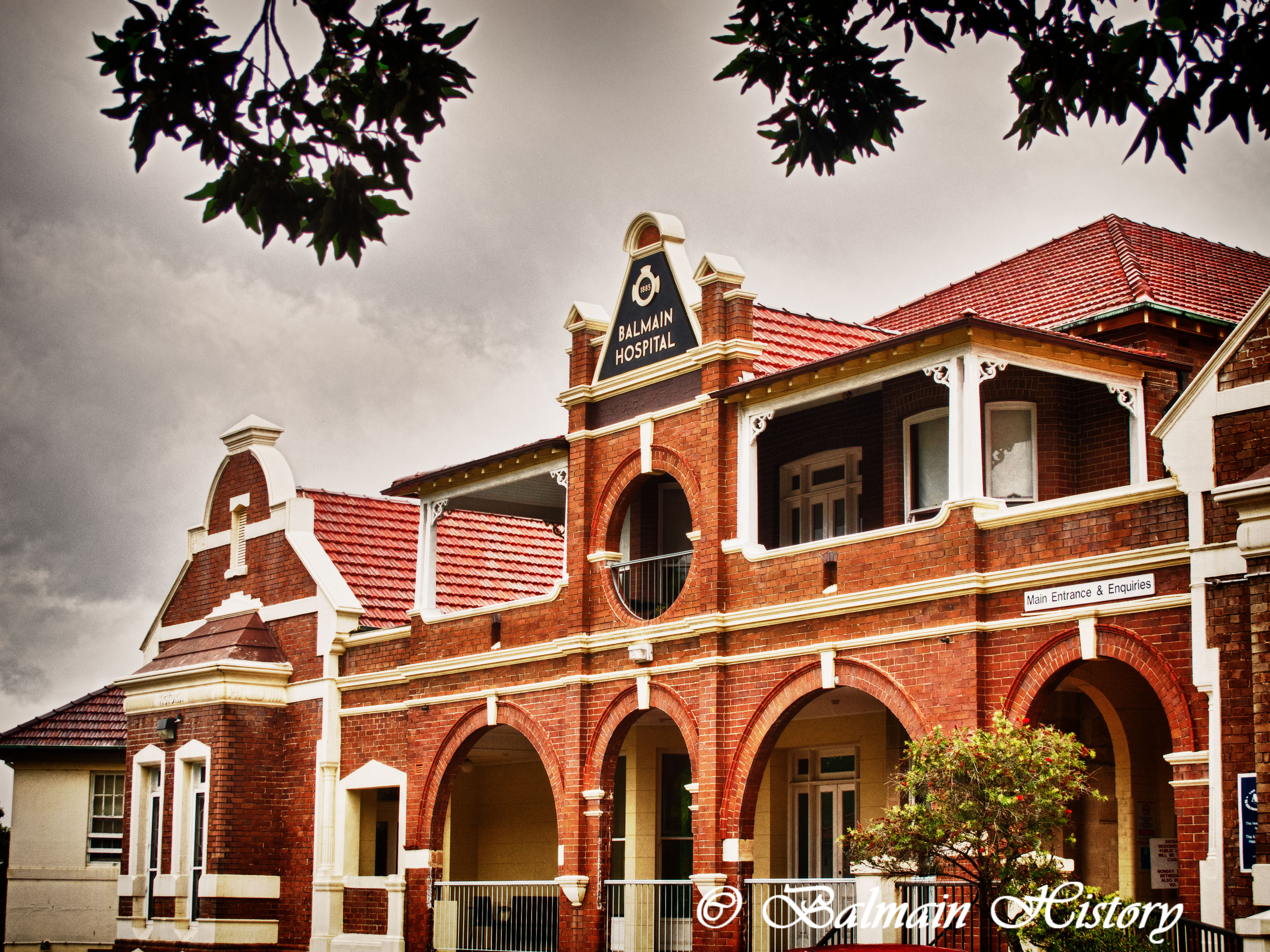
- Balmain Hospital main building, 2011

Geography
- Location: Booth Street, Balmain, New South Wales, Australia
- Coordinates: 33.8596702°S 151.1831414°E

Organisation
- Care system: Medicare (Australia)
- Type: Specialist
- Network: NSW Health

Services
- Emergency department: Yes - 08:00am to 10:00pm
- Beds: 98
- Speciality: Geriatric medicine, physical medicine and rehabilitation

History
- Former names: Balmain District Hospital; Balmain Cottage Hospital
- Founded: 1885; 141 years ago

Links
- Website: www.slhd.nsw.gov.au/balmain

Balmain Hospital (formerly Balmain Cottage Hospital and Balmain District Hospital) is a public hospital in the suburb of Balmain in Sydney, Australia. It was founded in 1885 and provides outpatient, rehabilitation, aged care and general practice/casualty services.

The hospital commenced operation in 1885 in an adapted cottage, which survives as the hospital's administration building and is now heritage listed. A series of additions and new buildings occurred throughout its early decades: a new wing (the Evans Ward) opened in March 1890, a new outpatient, women's and children's wing (the Victoria Ward) opened in September 1901, it underwent major refurbishment in 1908 and a new children's ward opened in September 1924.

It expanded significantly in the 1920s, increasing from 40 beds to 120 beds and experiencing a doubling of treated patients. Complaints about run-down, overcrowded and otherwise poor hospital facilities were common through the late 1920s and into the 1930s. New women's and children's wards opened in 1935 and new nurses quarters' (Stacey House) in 1937. A major new four-storey building, Thornton House, was added in 1943.

The hospital underwent a significant downgrade and refocus c. 1993, with the closure of the emergency department and change in focus to provide primarily for aged care and rehabilitation, though a new casualty department opened shortly afterwards to deal with remaining unmet need.

In 2019, Leadership Mentor Kylie Pagent and her husband, Nicholas Pagent, funded the revamp and extension of the hospital's casualty service facility. This included the funding of new equipment, the establishment of a children's activity corner and a revamped waiting room. Despite local investments, the Balmain Hospital suffered severe staff cuts in 2024 as result of Local Health District budget cuts.

The Balmain Hospital Main Building is listed on the New South Wales Heritage Register.
