= Waterview Wharf Workshops =

Maritime workshops in Sydney

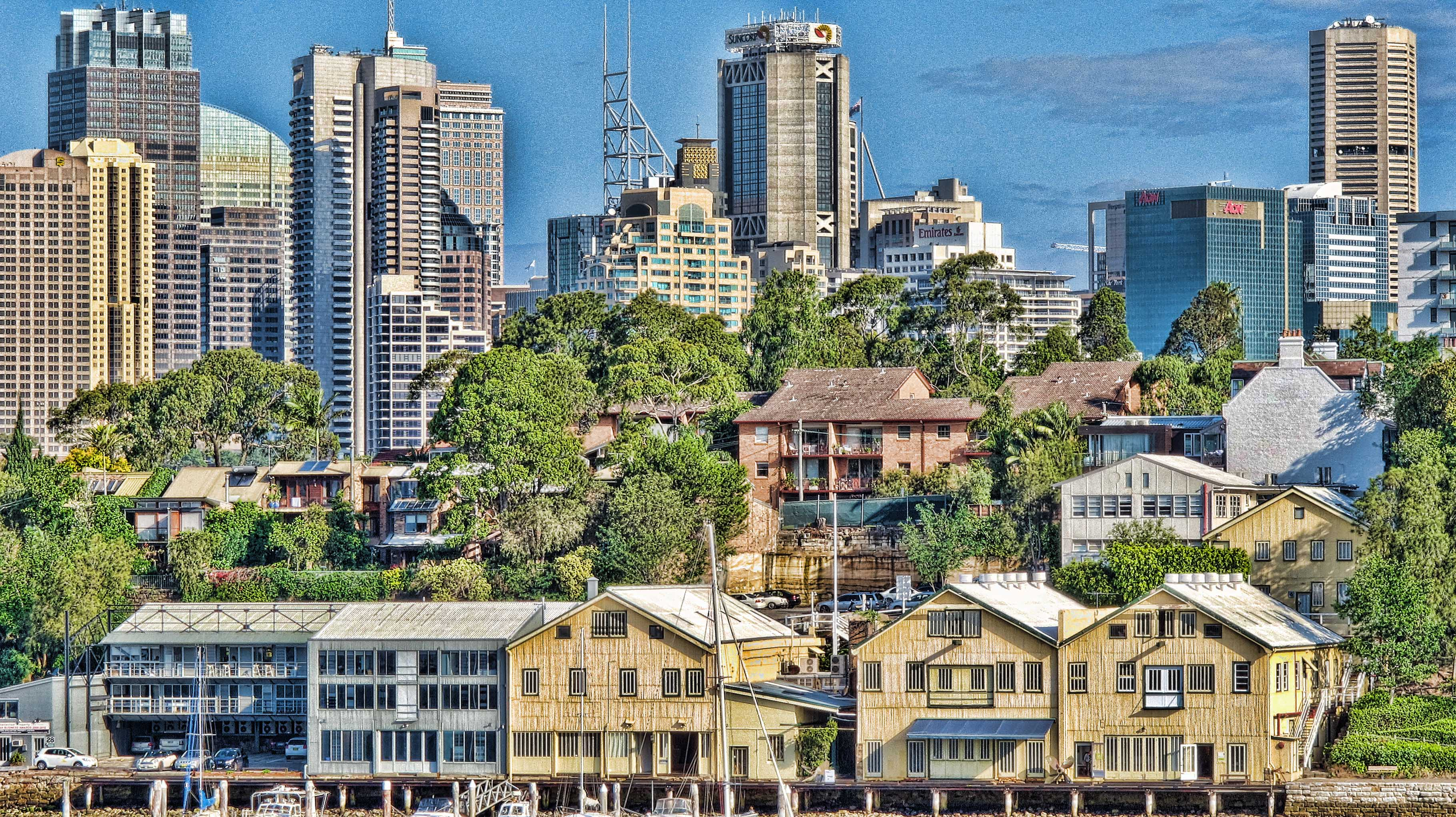

- Location within Sydney Location within Australia
- 33.8549°S 151.1925°E
- Location: 37 Nicholson Street, Balmain, Inner West Council, Sydney, New South Wales, Australia

History
- Built: 1880–1941

New South Wales Heritage Register
- Official name: Waterview Wharf Workshops; Adelaide Steamship Company wharf; Burns timber yard
- Type: state heritage (built)
- Designated: 2 April 1999
- Reference no.: 687
- Type: Shipyard
- Category: Transport - Water

Waterview Wharf Workshops is a heritage-listed former shipping company workshops at 37 Nicholson Street, Balmain, Inner West Council, Sydney, New South Wales, Australia. It was built from 1880 to 1941. It is also known as Adelaide Steamship Company wharf and Burns timber yard. It was added to the New South Wales State Heritage Register on 2 April 1999.

== History ==
The Waterview Wharf Workshops are purpose-built maritime industrial buildings on the foreshore of Waterview Bay, Balmain. They form part of the few surviving maritime structures which once stretched along the southern shore of the harbour from Balmain to Garden Island and includes the wharves of Pyrmont, Walsh Bay, Circular Quay and Woolloomooloo.

The key periods of significance of the property relate to the late 19th century and early 20th century use of the site. There are three distinct historical phases of development on the site. The first relates to the Burns timber yard from 1880 to 1898. The second (1900-1939) to the outbreak of World War II was the Adelaide Steamship Company. The third is the Adelaide Steamship Company during the World War II war years and its subsequent decline until the 1960s.

This workshops site, through erection of the stone sea wall and excavation of the former cliff to provide fill on which the Burns Mill was built, illustrates the importance of the waterfront industrial land in Balmain in the late 19th century.

The workshops are the last significant remnant of the early 20th century maritime industry which was concentrated in Waterview Bay and included Mort's Dock, West's Sail Loft, the UTA Ferry Workshops and Sydney Slipways. They represent the importance of maritime trade to the development of Sydney in the early 20th century. They are one of the most tangible remnants of the Adelaide Steamship Company which for decades was the largest shipping company in Australia. The siting of the company's workshops in Waterview (Mort) Bay was a major event in the maritime history of Sydney. The workshops are directly associated with Thomas Elder and Robert Barr Smith who were two of Australia's most prominent 19th century entrepreneurs.

The Waterview Wharf Workshops were one of the principal employers of labour in Balmain in the early 20th century. Like Mort's Dock, the Adelaide Steamship Company used casual labour rather than permanent labour and was responsible, in part, for the entrenching of union values in the suburb (of Balmain). The Waterview Wharf Workshops had the reputation for being the finest-equipped repair facilities of medium size in Sydney.

Building 2 is from the 1st phase of the Adelaide Steamship Company development on the site between 1900 and 1939. It was built in the final phase of the company('s occupation). It originally had a corrugated iron roof that was replaced with a corrugated asbestos roof c. 1940.

Building 1 was originally constructed c. 1940, likely of asbestos roofing and walls. This building is indicative of the historical decline in the shipbuilding industry and of Adelaide Steamship Company after the (Second World) war as it provides evidence of the last development phase on the site. It had ancillary functions and did not play an important role in the industrial use of the site.

The substantial site works and construction of new buildings on the site in the 1940s coincided with the increasingly widespread use of asbestos as a building material at this time.

== Description ==
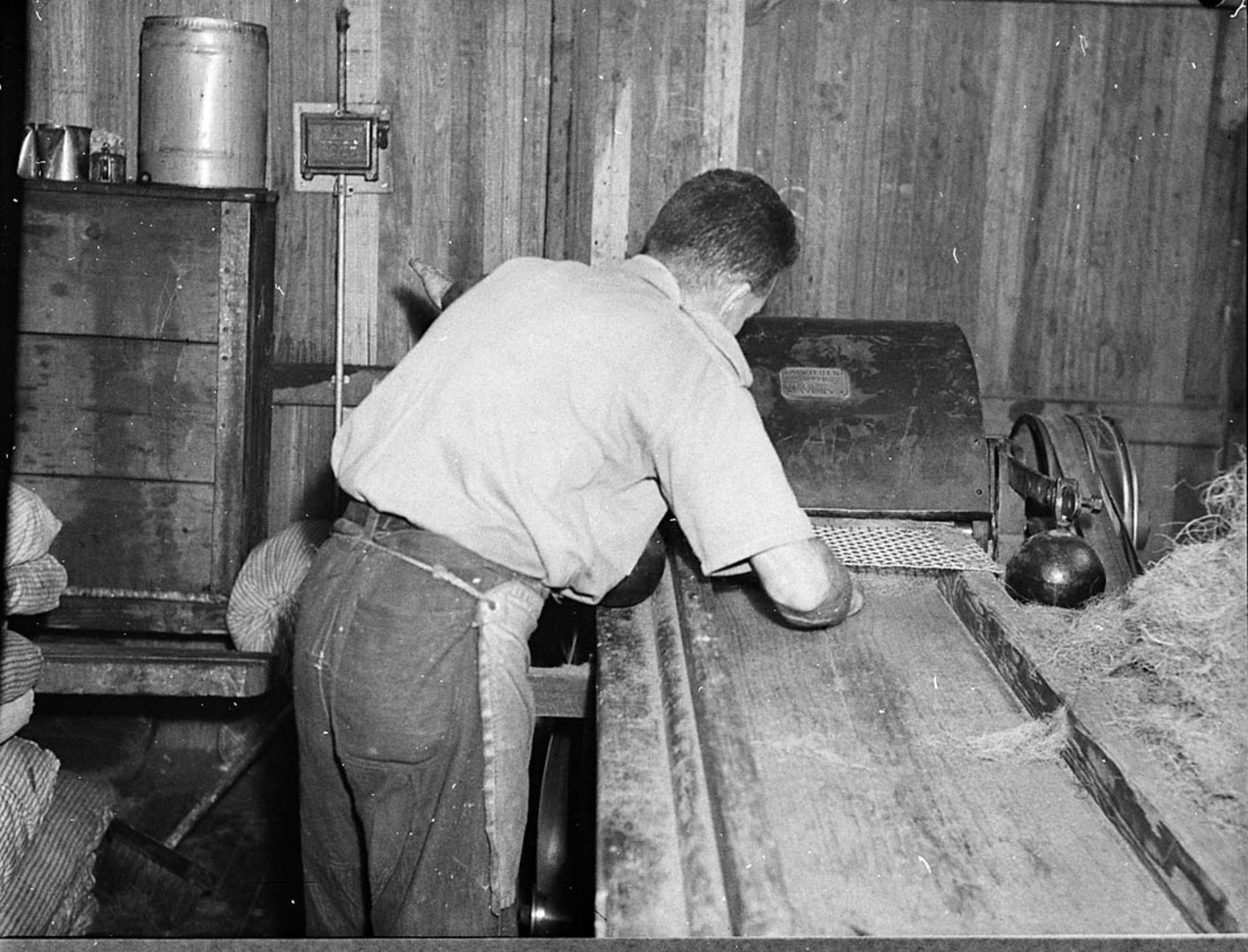
Machine at Adelaide Steamship Company, Balmain, 1947

=== Complex ===
The Waterview Wharf Workshops are an attractive, well-proportioned group of purpose-built maritime industrial buildings on the foreshore of Waterview Bay, Balmain. They form part of the few surviving maritime structures which once stretched along the southern shore of the harbour from Balmain to Garden Island and includes the wharves of Pyrmont, Walsh Bay, Circular Quay and Woolloomooloo.

The Waterview Wharf Workshops site, through erection of the stone sea wall and excavation of the former cliff to provide fill on which the Burns Mill was built, illustrates the importance of the waterfront industrial land in Balmain in the late 19th century.

The Waterview Wharf Workshops are the last significant remnant of the early 20th century maritime industry which was concentrated in Waterview Bay and included Mort's Dock, West's Sail Loft, the UTA Ferry Workshops and Sydney Slipways.

The workshops possess sufficient fabric for the site to be adequately interpreted in industrial archaeological terms.

The workshops are one of the few remaining industrial sites which exhibit, through the wharf access road and the air raid shelter, the effect of the Second World War on the fabric of domestic industrial sites.

=== Building 2 (c. 1900) ===
Located at the top of the site adjacent to the Zig Zag Reserve. This westernmost building was built at the same time as the lower, c.1900 buildings and is very similar in design and construction, albeit of a much-smaller scale. It has a timber frame with walls clad in corrugated iron, a corrugated asbestos cement roof with skylights and timber floors. It is two storeys, with the same type of windows as found elsewhere on site.

Provides physical evidence of an important historical phase on the site, that of the shipbuilding years of the Adelaide Steamship Company. It relates to the other Edwardian era buildings on the lower part of the site.

Its existing corrugated asbestos roof sheeting replaced an original corrugated iron roof c.1940. There is no ceiling lining and the underside of the roof cladding forms the ceiling.

=== Building 1 (c. 1940) ===
Constructed approximately when the roadway was built to provide office space, amenities and storage. Built variously of brick fibro and corrugated iron, it is (one of a number of) general-purpose personnel-centred buildings built, indicative of the historical decline in the shipbuilding industry and of Adelaide Steamship Company after the (Second World) war as it provides evidence of the last development phase on the site. It is likely the existing asbestos roof and walls are original fabric. It had ancillary functions and did not play an important role in the industrial use of the site.

== Heritage listing ==
Waterview Wharf Workshops was listed on the New South Wales State Heritage Register on 2 April 1999.
