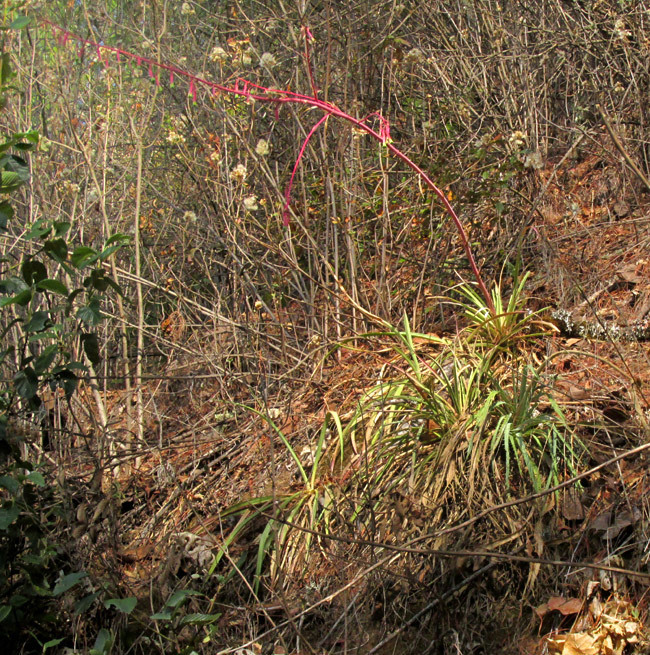

Scientific classification
- Kingdom: Plantae
- Clade: Embryophytes
- Clade: Tracheophytes
- Clade: Spermatophytes
- Clade: Angiosperms
- Clade: Monocots
- Order: Asparagales
- Family: Asparagaceae
- Subfamily: Agavoideae
- Genus: Beschorneria
- Species: B. tubiflora

Binomial name
- Beschorneria tubiflora (Kunth & C.D.Bouché) Kunth (1850)

Synonyms
- Furcraea tubiflora Kunth & C.D.Bouché (1845); Beschorneria tonelii Jacobi ex Hook.f. (1874)

= Beschorneria tubiflora =

Species of plant endemic to Mexico

Beschorneria tubiflora is a member of the subfamily Agavoideae of the family Asparagaceae. It is endemic to Mexico.

== Description ==
Beschorneria tubiflora, which has no commonly used English name, is an evergreen, succulent perennial that develops no stem. Its pinkish flowering head, or inflorescence, extends up to 1.8m (~6ft) high atop a slender peduncle. The penduncle arises from a rosette of tough, slender leaves whose margins bear many short, saw-like teeth. Below, some flowers are shown:

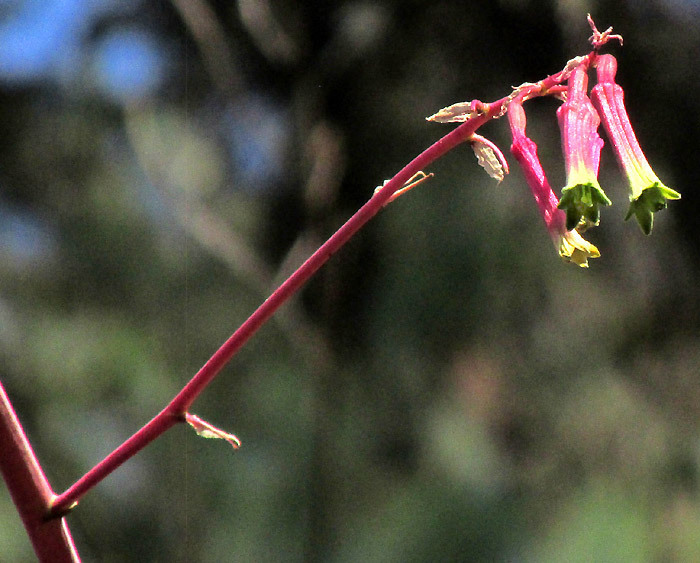
Beschorneria tubiflora flowers

== Habitat ==
There is little published habitat information. However, observations of a wild plant at iNaturalist indicate that it inhabits pine–oak forest in the mountains, as seen at iNaturalist observation #222470999.

== Distribution ==
This species, rarely observed, currently is known from the states of Hidalgo, México, Querétaro and San Luis Potosí.
