= Volunteer Hotel, Balmain =

Australian pub

Coordinates: 33°51′30″S 151°11′07″E

Volunteer Hotel
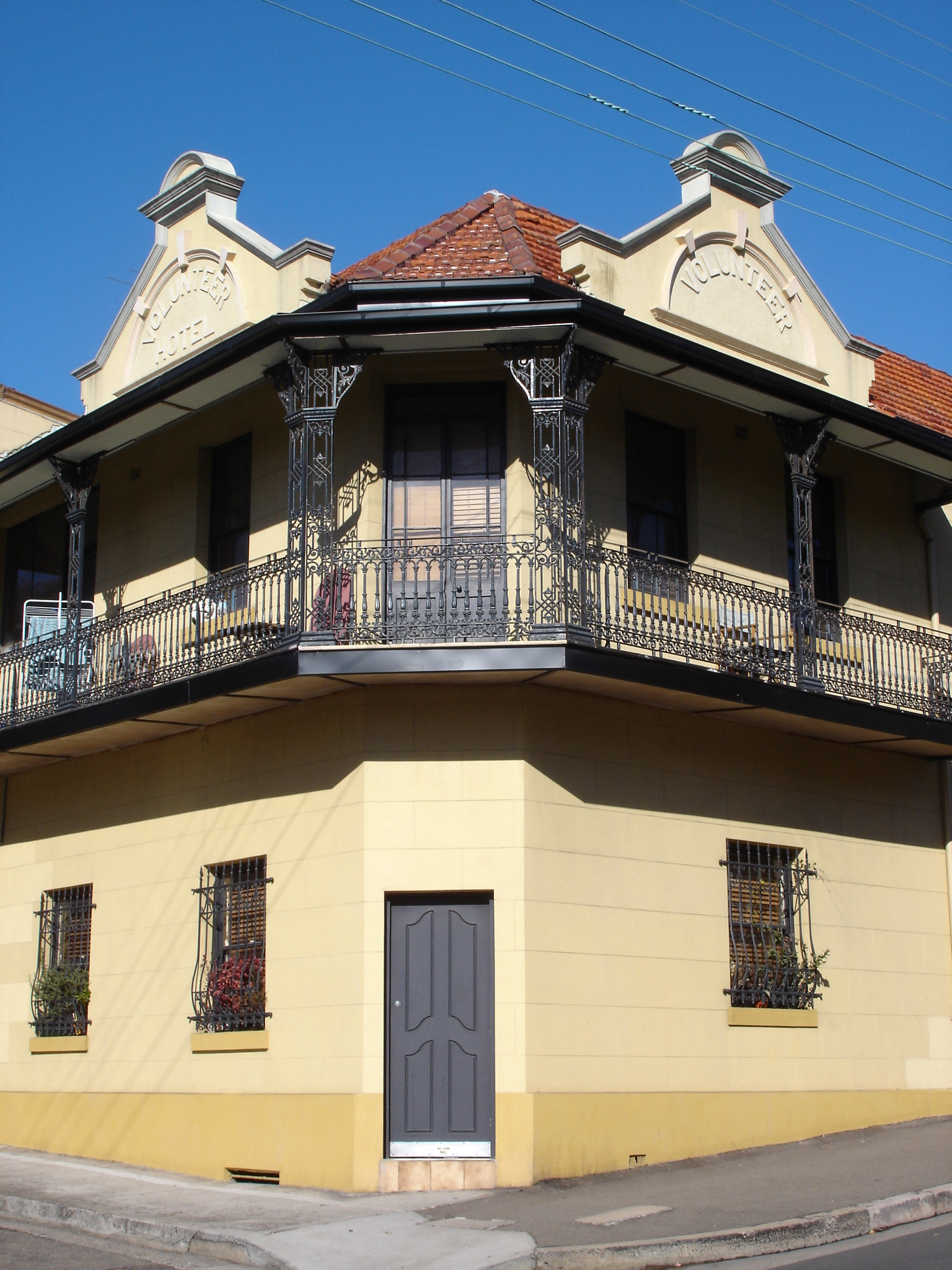
- Interactive map of the Volunteer Hotel area

General information
- Status: Closed
- Location: 214 Darling Street, Balmain, New South Wales, Australia
- Opened: 1865
- Closed: 1928

The Volunteer Hotel was a pub in the suburb of Balmain in the Inner West of Sydney, in the state of New South Wales, Australia.

The pub is named because of its association with a group of volunteer firefighters. The fire bell was located across the road in Darling Street and when it rang, the volunteers would gather and proceed on to the fire. Once their work was complete, they would meet at the hotel for refreshment.

The hotel was established before November 1865.

The hotel closed in 1928 and from 1930 was the location of Mrs Riley's confectionery shop. It is now a private residence.
