= Beschorneria septentrionalis =

- At the Royal Botanic Gardens Melbourne

Scientific classification
- Kingdom: Plantae
- Clade: Tracheophytes
- Clade: Angiosperms
- Clade: Monocots
- Order: Asparagales
- Family: Asparagaceae
- Subfamily: Agavoideae
- Genus: Beschorneria
- Species: B. septentrionalis

Binomial name
- Beschorneria septentrionalis García-Mend.

Species of plant

Beschorneria septentrionalis, the northern beschorneria or false red agave, is a species of flowering plant in the family Asparagaceae. It is native to Nuevo León and Tamaulipas in Mexico. A clump-forming perennial with a dramatic red flowering spike which reaches 1.5 m (5 ft), it is typically found in dry areas. It has gained the Royal Horticultural Society's Award of Garden Merit as an ornamental.
