= Star Hotel, Balmain =

Pub in Sydney, New South Wales, Australia

Star Hotel
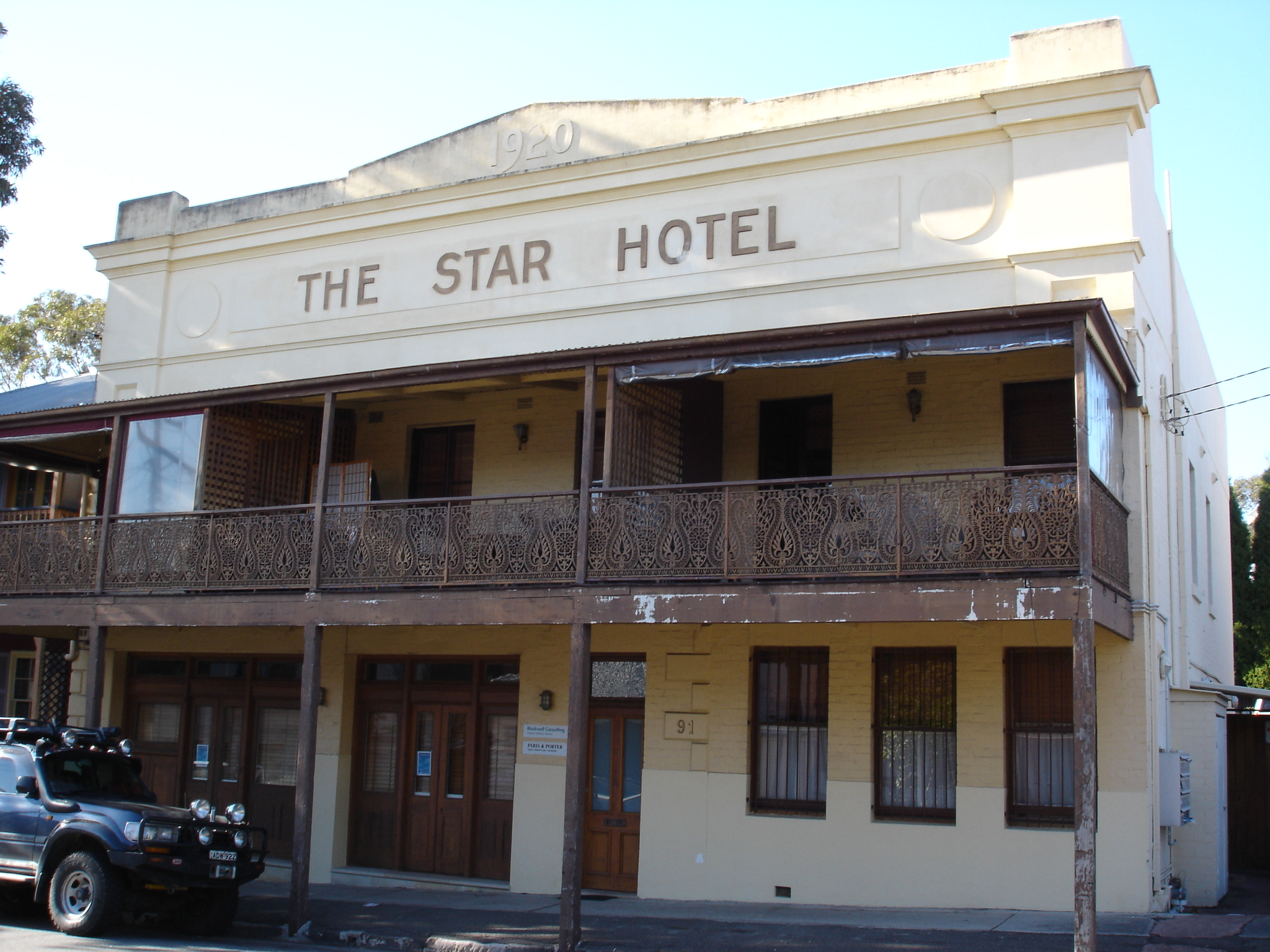
- Interactive map of the Star Hotel area

General information
- Location: 91 Mort Street, Balmain, New South Wales, Australia
- Coordinates: 33°51′18″S 151°11′02″E
- Opened: 1866
- Closed: 1930

The Star Hotel was a pub in the suburb of Balmain in the Inner West of Sydney, in the state of New South Wales, Australia.

The pub is located near the entrance to Mort's Dock and in 1902, the Ship Painters and Dockers Union took up a 'moveable office' at 95 Mort Street, next to the Star Hotel and undoubtedly supplied trade to the establishment.

The license and name were transferred in 1930 to the pub now known as The Cat and Fiddle Hotel on Darling Street. The building became a residential and commercial unit in 1994.
