= Balmain Hospital Main Building =

Balmain Hospital
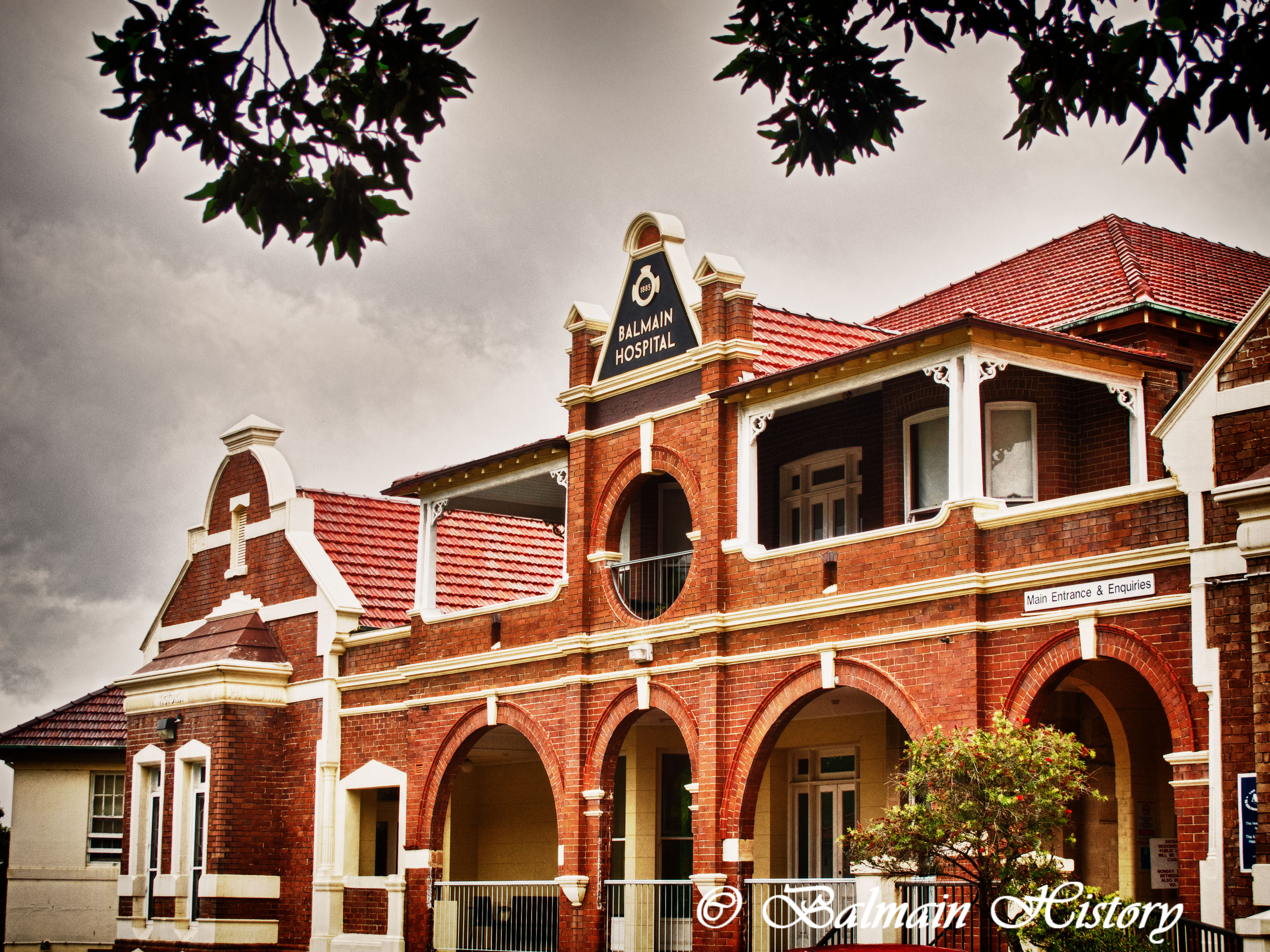
- Balmain Hospital main building, 2011

- Location within Sydney Location within Australia
- 33.8595°S 151.1820°E
- Location: Booth Street, Balmain, Inner West Council, Sydney, New South Wales, Australia

History
- Built: 1880

Site notes
- Architect: E. J. Bowen
- Owner: NSW Department of Health

New South Wales Heritage Register
- Official name: Balmain Hospital - Main Building; Administration Building; Evans Ward; Victoria Ward
- Type: state heritage (complex / group)
- Designated: 2 April 1999
- Reference no.: 814
- Type: Hospital
- Category: Health Services

Balmain Hospital Main Building is a hospital building and former cottage in Balmain, New South Wales, a suburb of Sydney, Australia. It was the original building of and remains the administration building for the Balmain Hospital. It was designed by E. J. Bowen and built in 1880. It is also known as the Administration Building, and includes the Evans Ward and the Victoria Ward. The property is owned by the NSW Department of Health. It was added to the New South Wales State Heritage Register on 2 April 1999.

== History ==
The nucleus of the Balmain Hospital was a pre-existing cottage known as Alderley. Its construction date is unknown; it may have been built in 1871 to the design of Edmund Blacket, but this has not been confirmed. A move was made to create a cottage hospital in Balmain in 1884, and a small cottage near the town hall was obtained, rent-free from the Government of New South Wales. Shortly after, increased demand meant that the hospital needed to expand and Alderley was purchased in 1885.

The Evans Ward was added in 1896 and the Victoria Ward in 1901.

In 1907 the nurses' accommodation was added above Alderley and a verandah added to the Evans Ward. The name of the hospital changed to the Balmain District Hospital at that time.

== Description ==
=== Central administration section ===
The Administration portion is the central component of the main building connecting the Evans and Victoria Wards.

It is a three-storey element, built in the Federation Anglo-Dutch style. Externally the building's federation style features are relatively intact and its characteristics are as follows; essentially symmetrical facade; red brick with painted stone or stucco trim; enclosed verandahs to upper storey separated by an elaborate parapeted gable bearing the hospital name and the date of inception. Enclosed verandah to the ground floor with late twentieth century aluminium framed glazing set in finely crafted brick arches. Painted cement render and painted sandstone to the lower ground floor with small windows providing light to the basement. Simple hipped medium pitched roofs with terracotta tiles.

Internally the buildings components reveal two distinct phases of development ranging from the mid-late nineteenth century to the Federation period (formerly Alderley).

=== Evans Ward ===
The Evans Ward is attached to the northern side of the administration portion. It is a two-storey wing built in the Federation Anglo-Dutch style. Its fabric both internally and externally remains essentially intact and characterised as follows; small scale symmetrical facade with a projecting bay window. Red brick with painted stone trim. Elaborated parapeted gable including a roof ventilator. Medium pitched terracotta tile roof. Timber window joinery. Original timber skirting boards and trim to ground floor. Ornate pressed metal ceilings, beam encasing and iron structural columns to ground floor. Fireplaces have been infilled on the ground floor. Leadlight windows and doors on ground floor typical of early Federation period.

=== Victoria Ward ===
The Victoria Ward is attached to the southern side of the administration portion. Its external fabric is virtually identical to that of Evans Ward, however the slight variation in the colour of bricks reveals that the two wards were not necessarily built at the same time.

=== Modifications and dates ===
Parts of the original cottage known as "Alderley" occupied by the Hospital in 1885 remain buried below the present Administration building.

- c. 1890: Booth House
- 1896: Evans Ward
- 1901: Victoria Ward
- 1907: Facade and upper floor to the Administration building between Evans and Victoria Wards
- 1907: Some components of the verandah to the north face of Evans Ward. Modifications to the building include infilled openings.
- 1965: tiles to roofs of Evans and Victoria Wards
- 1978: Enclosure of verandah at Evans Ward

== Heritage listing ==
The Balmain Hospital (Administration Building, Evans Ward and Victoria Ward) is historically significant as it was one of the earliest cottage hospitals developments in Sydney and the cottage hospital development in medical care was a highly significant component of welfare. The adaptation from middle class domestic housing to servicing the needs of an increasingly working class population provides an important example of the evolving social profile of the area. The Balmain Hospital represents an ongoing activity of rht local community. Its establishment in 1885 was as a result of community initiatives and it is a facility which still has meaning and is greatly valued by a large part of the community in the peninsula area and beyond. The Evans Ward, Victoria Ward and Administration Building between them display fine architectural qualities. The physical fabric is capable of demonstrating the full range of development from residential to medical.

Balmain Hospital - Main Building was listed on the New South Wales State Heritage Register on 2 April 1999 having satisfied the following criteria.

The place is important in demonstrating the course, or pattern, of cultural or natural history in New South Wales.

The Main Administration Building including the Evans and Victoria Wards, provides clear physical evidence of a major phase of the hospital development, undertaken in the late 19th and very early 20th centuries, as well as evidence of the original hospital cottage which itself pre-dates the Hospital's establishment.

Evidence of the latter is limited and less easily interpreted. It may be found to be an Edmund Blackett building which would provide a strong associational link. The fabric of the hospital development phase is largely intact and remains the Hospital's main address as interpreted by the community.

In addition to the early 20th century development the building records a series of later alterations made to accommodate changing needs.

The place is important in demonstrating aesthetic characteristics and/or a high degree of creative or technical achievement in New South Wales.

The Main Administration Building provides the site with its finest orchestral component. Its external visible fabric retains most of the original architectural details and character, with the exception of the slate roofs and the chimneys which were removed.

The Evans and Victoria Wards' facades are examples of the Federation Anglo-Dutch style which developed in Britain as a reaction against classical and Gothic Styles. Relatively few examples of this style remain in Australia today making the building rare. The building is a restrained example of this style but nonetheless a fine one.

The place has strong or special association with a particular community or cultural group in New South Wales for social, cultural or spiritual reasons.

The community perception of this building's role is consistent with its use. It is clearly seen as a major component of the hospital.

Despite substantial changes in usage of some parts of the building, the majority of detailing and the spatial arrangements inspirited in the early 20th century have remained, enabling the interpretation of their original use to be made.
