= Louisaville =

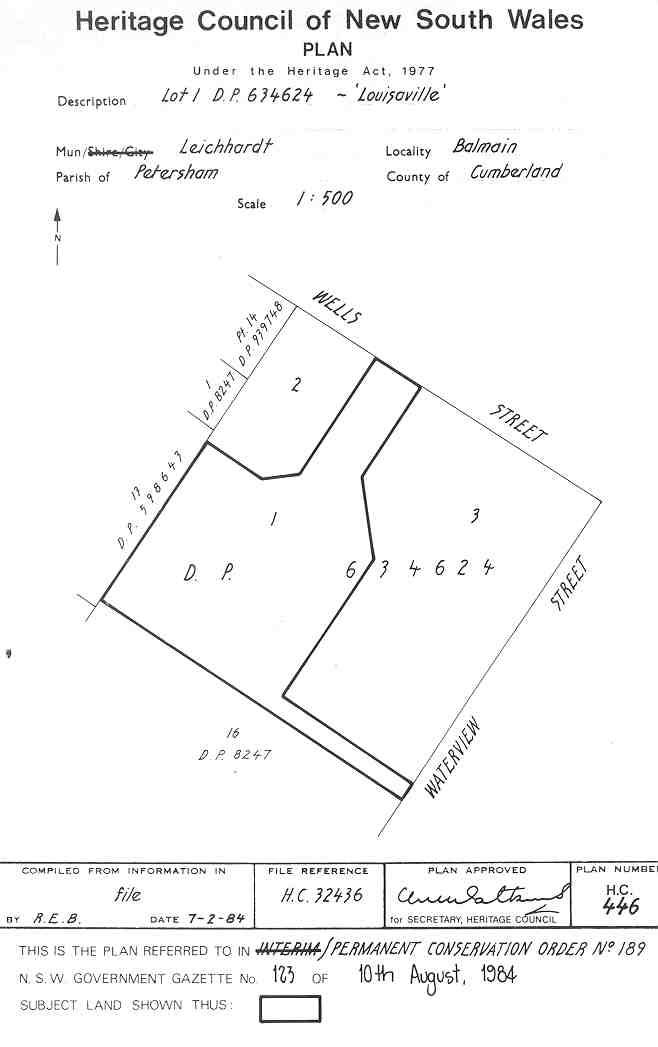
- Heritage boundaries

- Location within Sydney Location within Australia
- 33.8566°S 151.1862°E
- Location: 2 Wells Street, Balmain, Inner West Council, Sydney, New South Wales, Australia

New South Wales Heritage Register
- Official name: Louisaville; Inglefield House
- Type: state heritage (built)
- Designated: 2 April 1999
- Reference no.: 189
- Type: historic site

Louisaville is a heritage-listed residence at 2 Wells Street, Balmain, Inner West Council, Sydney, New South Wales, Australia. It is also known as Inglefield House. It was built by William Carss. It was added to the New South Wales State Heritage Register on 2 April 1999.

== History ==
Surgeon William Balmain was granted 550 acres and most of the area now encompassing Balmain in 1800. In 1801 the entire grant was transferred to fellow surgeon John Gilchrist. Gilchrist never actually lived in NSW and advertised the land for sale in 1823. However, the sale was not a success. He gave power of attorney to his Sydney-based agent and merchant, Frank Parbury, who commissioned Surveyor John Armstrong to subdivide part of the land. In 1836 22, 2-4 acres lots mostly about Balmain East were auctioned for sale by Parbury on behalf of the absentee landowner, Gilchrist.

Parbury himself leased/bought 10 acres at the south eastern part of the Waterview Bay and built the first house on the Balmain grant, Waterview House in 1835 (demolished c. 1905). It was later purchased by George Cooper, Comptroller of Customs, who owned/ leased 28 acres adjacent to the west. Cooper subsequently fell victim to the crash of the early 1840s and was declared bankrupt. He had taken out a mortgage to Matthew Henry Marsh, a barrister, pastoralist and parliamentarian just prior and his inability to pay brought about the loss of the Waterview Estate to Marsh.

The land was subdivided by A. W. Miekle in 1841 and site became part Marsh's 1843 sale. Melbourne investors and merchants, Joseph Herring and Lesley Alexander Moody bought lots 30 to 34 in Waterview Street from Marsh in March 1843. Lots 30 to 32 were subsequently purchased by William Carss in October 1849 for 80 pounds. It would appear that the improved economic conditions allowed Carrs to construct a house on the land some time between 1849 and 1855 when the land was sold to Zachary Ingold for 1200 pounds. The increase in cost would indicate significant improvements to the land and conveyance included a dwelling called "Inglefield House".

Ingold sold to James Yeend, a Sydney innkeeper and prominent Balmain citizen and Municipality of Balmain alderman in 1857. During the early 1860s Yeend sold a 20 feet strip of this land to allow for the construction of Wells Street. His wife continued to reside in the house following his death in 1864. Yeend Street, Yeend Wharf and Yeend Terrace are named after him.

Yeend retained the name of the house and his widow stayed on until 1880 when the three lots were sold to William Harris Ariell for 400 pounds. Ariell renamed the house “Louisaville” after his wife. Ariell died in 1882, but the house was enlarged between 1887 and 1896. A mock-Gothic entrance porch, western additions and detached weatherboard structure were added during this time.

A Sydney Water plan (Balmain Sheet No. 16) prepared in the late 1880s and revised in the early 1890s shows the house occupying a large roughly square shaped block bounded by Waterview and Wells Streets. It would appear that part of the northern corner may have been subdivided a structure constructed in the periods between the late 1880s and 1890s. The house is setback from the street frontages and located in north western corner of the site. Sited on an angle a front verandah is clear facing the Wells Street frontage. Several wings are shown attached to the northern end of the building. A long detached structure is also shown constructed to the south western site boundary. Part of the attached and northern detached structure and small addition to the south eastern façade of the building are shaded on the plan, indicating that they were added in the period between the late 1880s and 1890s.

Louisa Ariell lived in the house until her death in 1931 when her daughter, Louisa, inherited the property. In 1940 she sold the property to Charlotte and William Holloway.

Since that time it would appear that the site was subdivided into three parcels with separate portions formed at the corner of Wells and Waterview Streets and along the Wells Street frontage. Some alterations and additions have also been undertaken to the building and new fence and landscaping undertaken to Wells Street.

The state government made an Interim Conservation Order over Louisaville on 21 November 1980 following the sale of the property, and upgraded it to a Permanent Conservation Order on 4 August 1984. It was threatened with demolition in the early 1980s, but survived after an alternate proposal led to the subdivision of Louisaville's surrounding land for the construction of townhouses. The house was then restored and extended under new owners.

== Description ==
Louisaville is a one-storey dwelling with an attic face stone and rendered walls with hipped gable and skillion roofs clad in corrugated steel and stone and rendered chimneys. A gable roofed dormer with corrugated steel and slate cladding and timber framed double hung window is also located on the northern roof slope. An open verandah extends across the front of the building. The verandah is elevated above ground level with stone steps and floor on a stone base. Timber posts support the hipped verandah roof which is also clad in corrugated steel. The verandah also has a timber balustrade and timber boarding partially encloses the eastern end. The front façade also has pairs of timber and glass French doors with timber shutters and twelve paned timber framed double hung windows with stone sills. Timber framed windows are also located at the gable end. A single storey skillion roofed wing extends from the western side and rear of the house. The western wing faces a paved courtyard. The rear façade features two tall, stone chimneys and faces an open grassed yard. A long, two storey rendered outbuilding also with half hipped roof clad in corrugated steel, timber framed windows and door and small verandah at the western end is constructed to the rear boundary. A narrow drive extends from the southern corner of the site to Waterview Street. Another small rendered outbuilding is located adjacent to the paved patio area.

The house is set well back from the Wells Street frontage which has heavy timber post and picket fence and gate on a rock and stone base with terraced garden between featuring several mature trees including a large magnolia grandiflora and Sydney Cove Fig. Stone steps extend up the gate and a concrete path extends through the garden to the building entry.

Various alterations and early additions are evident in the building fabric, stone and rendered facades. A skylight has been added to the front roof slope with modern services also added to the rear. The large outbuilding to the rear has also been modified with garage door opening on the eastern side. Concrete and brick paving and patio are relatively recent additions.

== Significance ==
No. 2 Wells Street is of historic and aesthetic significance as a good and intact representative example of a stone and rendered Victorian Regency dwelling constructed sometime between 1849 and 1855. Despite subdivision of the site and some alterations the building retains its original and early form and fabric including face stone and rendered facades and chimneys, open verandah and associated details, roof form and pattern of openings. The building is enhanced by its garden setting and mature trees which make a positive contribution to the local area.

== Heritage listing ==
Louisaville was listed on the New South Wales State Heritage Register on 2 April 1999.
