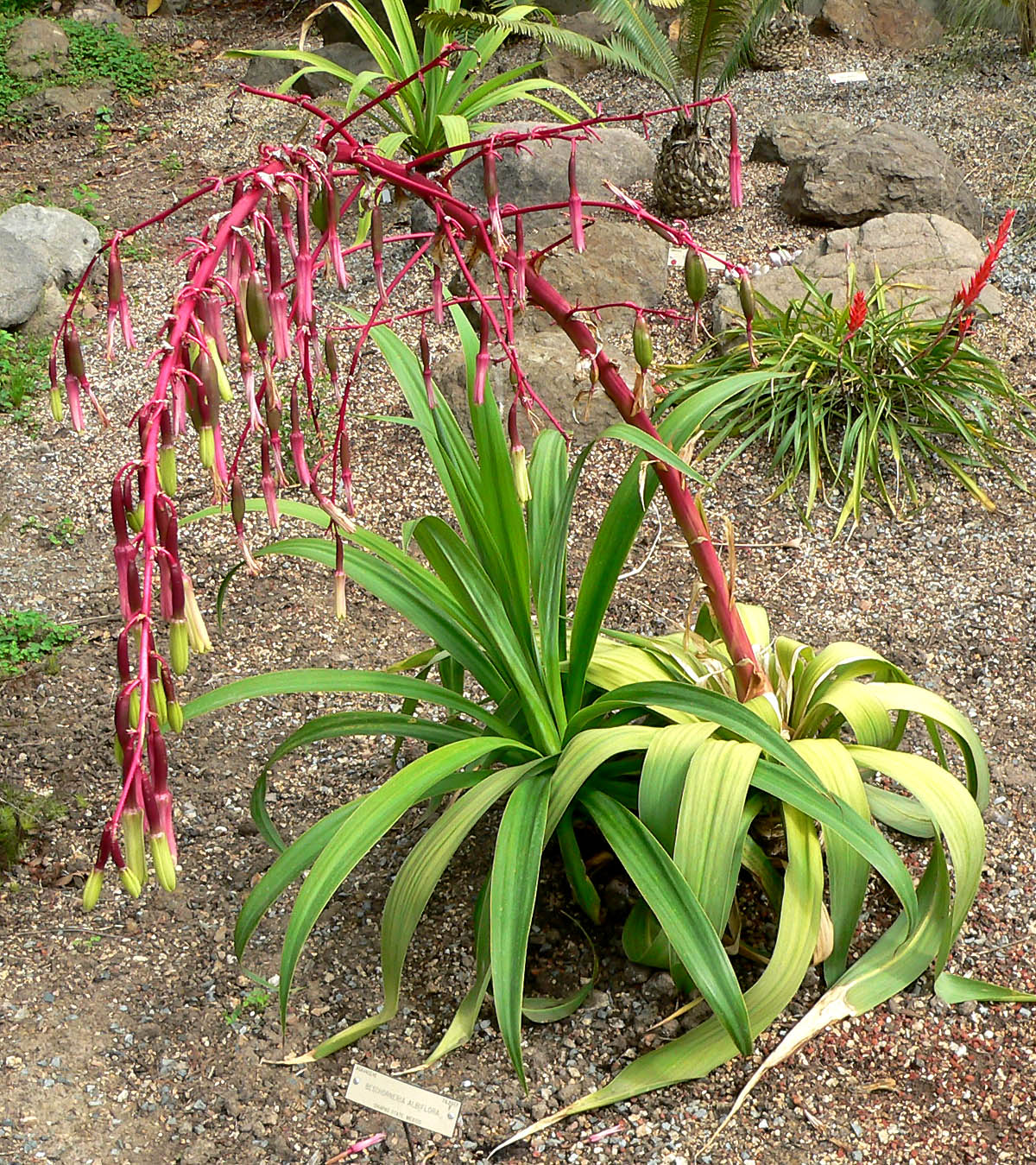
- Beschorneria albiflora

Scientific classification
- Kingdom: Plantae
- Clade: Embryophytes
- Clade: Tracheophytes
- Clade: Spermatophytes
- Clade: Angiosperms
- Clade: Monocots
- Order: Asparagales
- Family: Asparagaceae
- Subfamily: Agavoideae
- Genus: Beschorneria; Kunth

= Beschorneria =

Genus of flowering plants

Beschorneria is a genus of succulent plants belonging to the family Asparagaceae, subfamily Agavoideae, native to semi-arid areas of Mexico and Central America. They are generally large evergreen perennials forming clumps of grey-green leaves, with tall flower-spikes to 1.5 metres (4.9 ft). Marginally hardy, they may require winter protection in areas subject to frost.

Species

1. Beschorneria albiflora Matuda – Oaxaca, Chiapas, Guatemala, Honduras
2. Beschorneria calcicola A.García-Mendoza – Oaxaca
3. Beschorneria carolinae Jimeno-Sevilla & García-Gutiérrez – Veracruz
4. Beschorneria dubia Carrière – Tamaulipas
5. Beschorneria rigida Rose – Guanajuato, San Luis Potosí, Puebla
6. Beschorneria septentrionalis A.García Mendoza – Tamaulipas, Nuevo León
7. Beschorneria starrii Davis – Puebla, Veracruz
8. Beschorneria tubiflora (Kunth & C.D.Bouché) Kunth – San Luis Potosí, Hidalgo
9. Beschorneria wrightii Hook.f – México State
10. Beschorneria yuccoides K.Koch – Hidalgo, Puebla, Veracruz

formerly included

Three names have been coined using the name Beschorneria (B. floribunda, B. multiflora, and B. parmentieri), all referring to the species now known as Furcraea parmentieri. See Furcraea.
