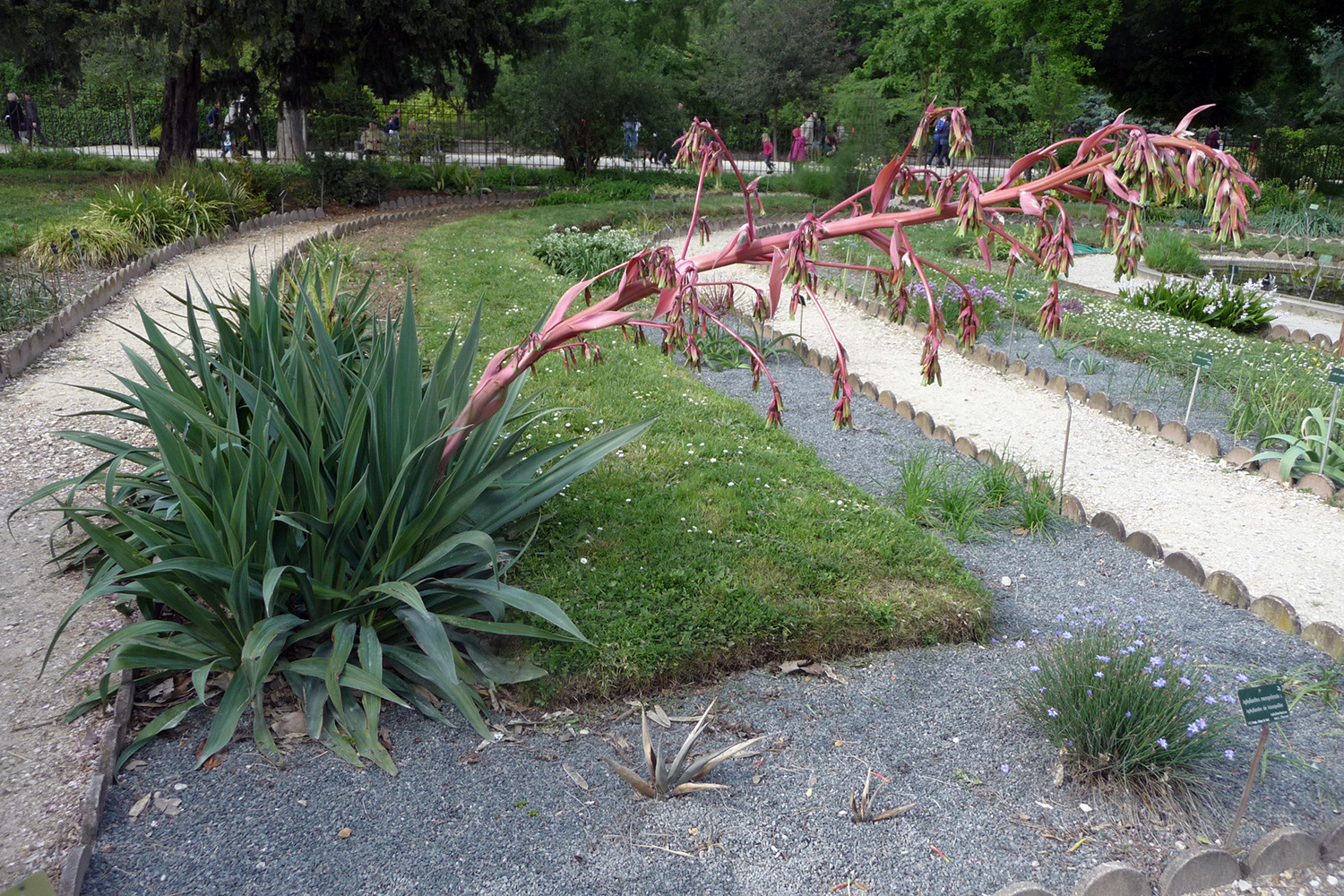
- Beschorneria yuccoides subsp. yuccoides

Scientific classification
- Kingdom: Plantae
- Clade: Tracheophytes
- Clade: Angiosperms
- Clade: Monocots
- Order: Asparagales
- Family: Asparagaceae
- Subfamily: Agavoideae
- Genus: Beschorneria
- Species: B. yuccoides

Binomial name
- Beschorneria yuccoides K.Koch

= Beschorneria yuccoides =

Species of flowering plant

Beschorneria yuccoides is a species of succulent plant belonging to the family Asparagaceae, subfamily Agavoideae.

== Etymology ==
The epithet yuccoides is a compound of the botanical name of the genus Yucca and the Greek suffix -ό-εἶδος (o-eidos) oides meaning "likeness".

== Subspecies ==
- Beschorneria yuccoides subsp. yuccoides
- Beschorneria yuccoides subsp. dekosteriana (K.Koch) Govaerts

== Description ==
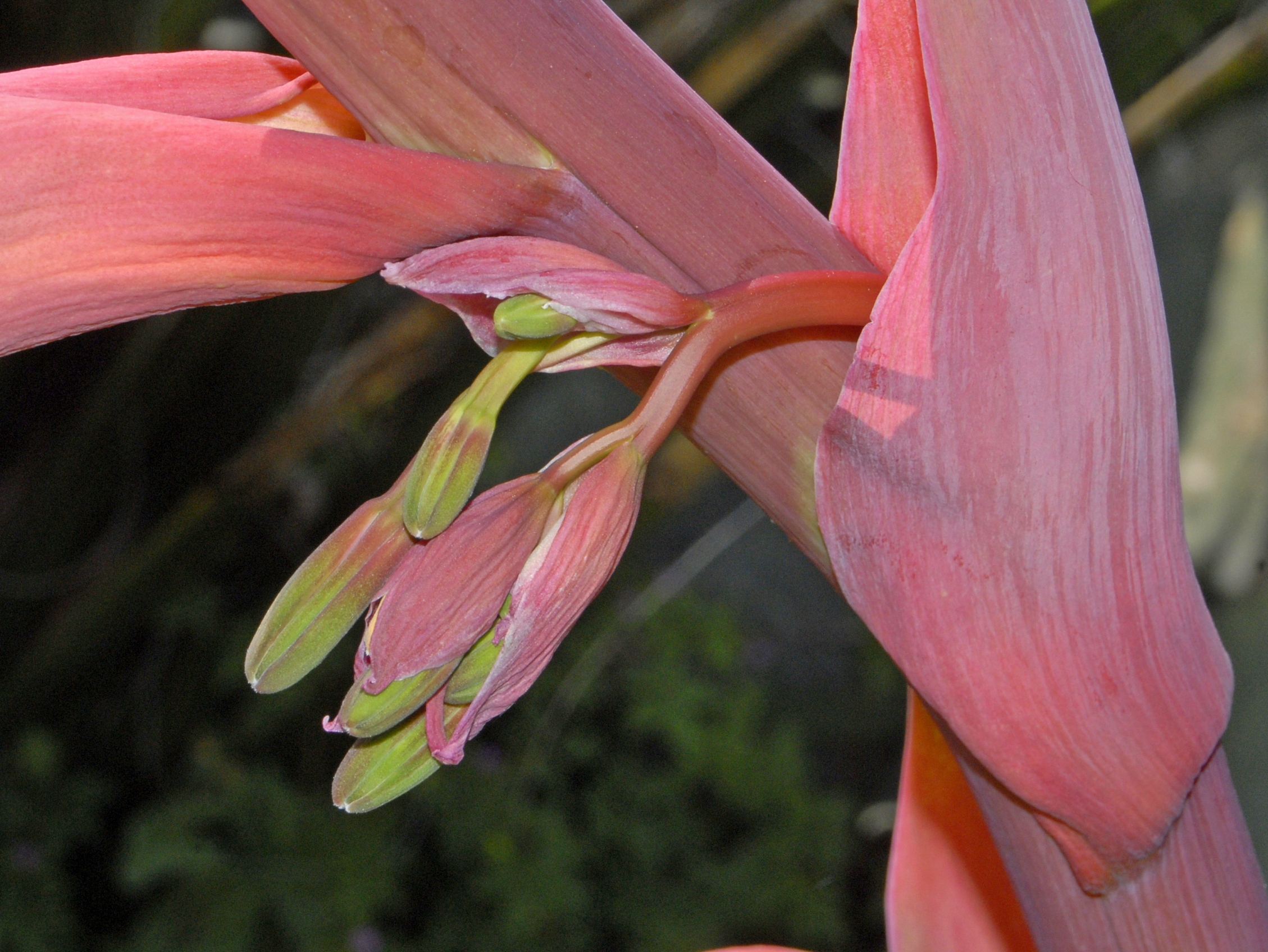
Blooms of Beschorneria yuccoides

Beschorneria yuccoides is a stemless plant with 20 to 35 linear, lanceolate, leathery leaves that are widened at their base. They are gray-green to green, about 40–60 cm (16–24 in) long and 3.3–3.5 cm (1.3–1.4 in) wide. The leaf margins are finely denticulate. The inflorescence reaches a height of 100–180 cm (39–71 in), with a maximum of 320 cm (130 in). The stem and the bract are red. The flowers are 40 to 50 mm long. The fruits are elongated to almost spherical, 30–40 mm (1.2–1.6 in) long and 15–25 mm (0.59–0.98 in) wide.

== Distribution ==
Beschorneria yuccoides is present in Mexico, in the states of Hidalgo, Puebla and Veracruz, at an elevation of 2,700–3,000 m (8,900–9,800 ft) above sea level.

== Cultivation ==
This plant is not tolerant of severe freezes, and is best suited to warm, sheltered south- or west-facing places in full sun, where temperatures do not fall below −5 °C (23 °F). Alternatively, it can be grown under glass.

It grows outdoors at Earlscliffe, Howth, County Dublin, Ireland, at a latitude of 53.3º N, where it benefits from the unusually favourable microclimate.

In cultivation in the UK it has gained the Royal Horticultural Society's Award of Garden Merit.
