= Balmain, New South Wales =

Suburb of Sydney, Australia

Balmain
- Suburb
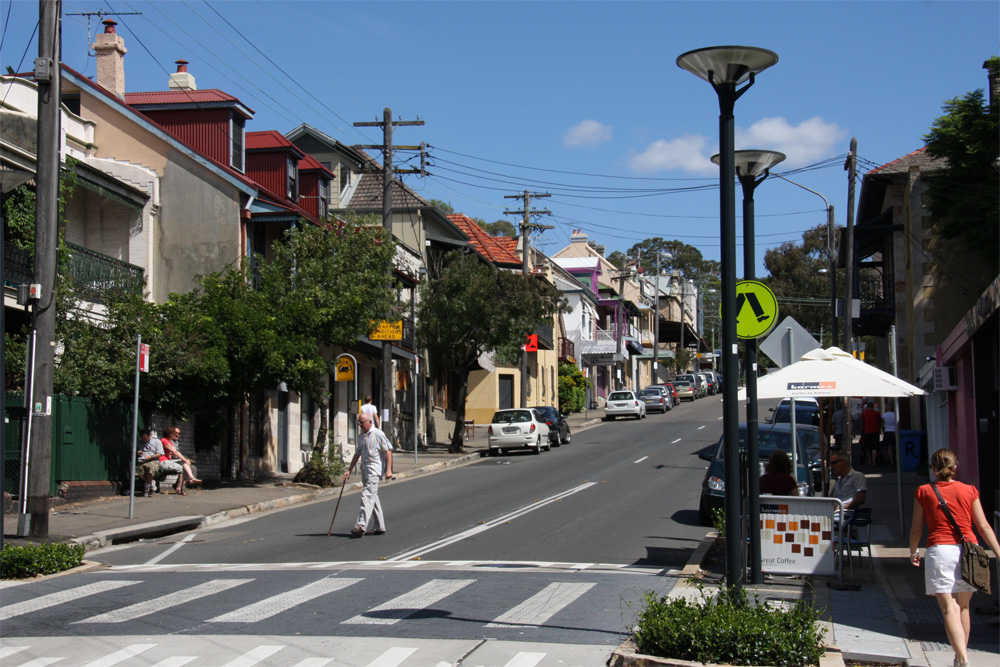
- Darling Street

- Interactive map of Balmain
- Coordinates: 33°51′32″S 151°10′45″E
- Country: Australia
- State: New South Wales
- City: Sydney
- LGA: Inner West Council
- Location: 5 km (3.1 mi) west of Sydney CBD
- Established: 1836

Government
  - State electorate: Balmain
  - Federal division: Sydney

Area
  - Total: 1.54 km^{2} (0.59 sq mi)
- Elevation: 49 m (161 ft)

Population
  - Total: 10,454 (2021 census)
  - Density: 6,788/km^{2} (17,580/sq mi)
- Postcode: 2041
Suburbs around Balmain
Drummoyne	Birchgrove
Rozelle	Balmain	Balmain East
Rozelle	Rozelle

Balmain is a suburb in the Inner West of Sydney, New South Wales, Australia. It is located two kilometres (1 1/4 miles) west of the Sydney central business district, in the local government area of the Inner West Council. It is located on the Balmain peninsula surrounded by Port Jackson, adjacent to the suburbs of Rozelle to the south-west, Birchgrove to the north-west, and Balmain East to the east. Iron Cove sits on the western side of the peninsula, with White Bay on the south-east side and Mort Bay on the north-east side.

Traditionally blue collar, Balmain was where the industrial roots of the trade unionist movement began. It has become established in Australian working-class culture and history, due to being the place where the Australian Labor Party formed in 1891 and its social history and status is of high cultural significance to both Sydney and New South Wales. Today, the ALP contends with the Australian Greens for political prominence in Balmain, and Kobi Shetty of the Greens holds the State seat of Balmain.

In the 21st century however, Balmain is often considered to be an affluent area. According to the 2021 Australian Bureau of Statistics, Balmain had a Median weekly household income of $3,039, and a 2021 article on the Domain website described Balmain as a Harbourside version and cheaper version of Eastern Suburb Paddington.

== History ==
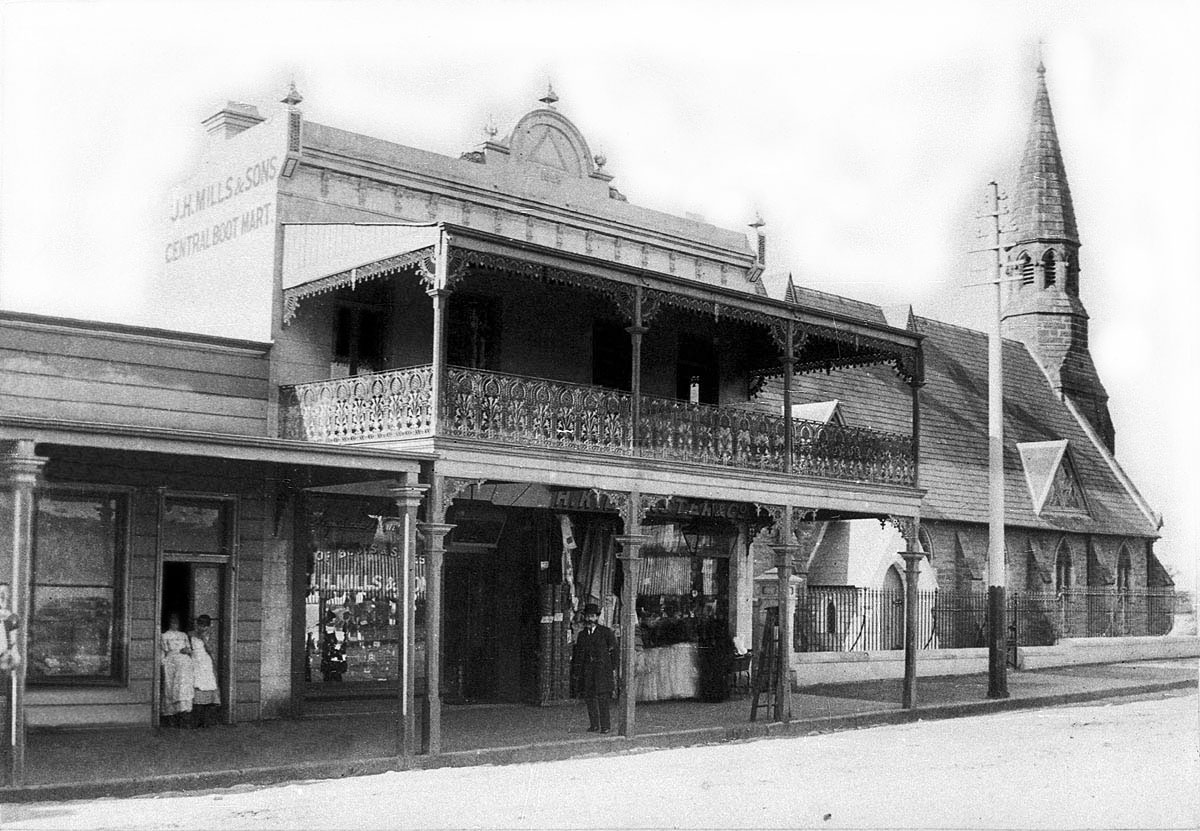
Darling Street around 1888

Prior to European settlement, the area was inhabited by indigenous Aboriginal Australian, Gadigal and Wangal people. Stories from early settlers in the area tell of how the local indigenous people used to hunt kangaroo by driving them through the bushy peninsula, down the hill to Peacock Point at the east end, where they were killed.

The area now known as Balmain was part of a 220-hectare (550-acre) grant to colonial surgeon William Balmain (1762–1803) made in 1800 by Governor John Hunter. A year later, Balmain transferred his entire holding to settle a debt to John Borthwick Gilchrist before returning to Scotland. The legality of the land transfer from Balmain to Gilchrist for only 5 shillings was challenged by Balmain's descendants and further development of the area was blocked. The area subsequently became known as Gilchrist's place, though court documents refer to the area as the Balmain Estate.

During the many years of legal challenges, the land was leased for farming and cattle purposes. In 1814 the adjacent homestead of Birchgrove was sold to Roland Warpole Loane, a merchant and settler descended from a family of English landlords. One hundred acres on the adjoining Balmain estate were leased to Loane.

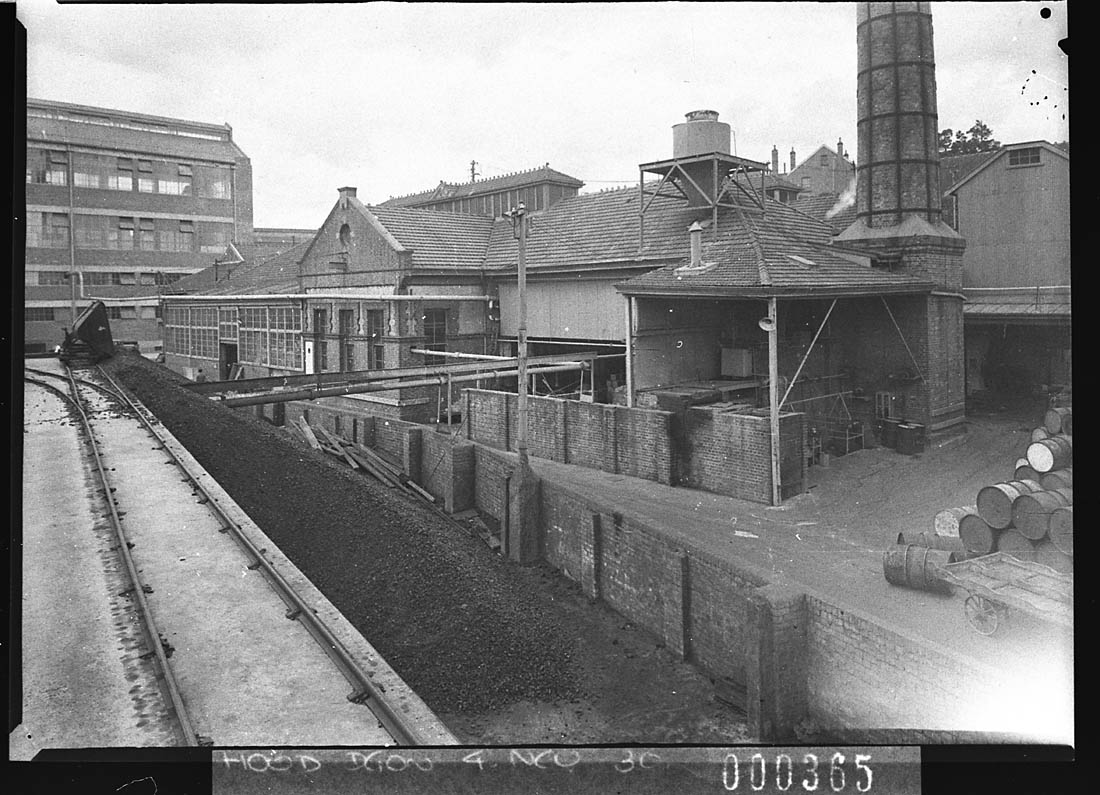
Lever Brothers Factory 1939

In 1833, Gilchrist transferred power of attorney to Frederick Parbury. When Loane's lease finally expired in 1836 and the land retrieved from his possession, Parbury commissioned surveyor John Armstrong to sub-divide the land into six parcels. Three parcels were sold to Thomas Hyndes in 1837. The area was rapidly sub-divided and developed during the 1840s and by 1861 had been divided into the well populated eastern suburb of Balmain and the sparsely populated western area, extending to the gates of Callan Park, known as Balmain West.

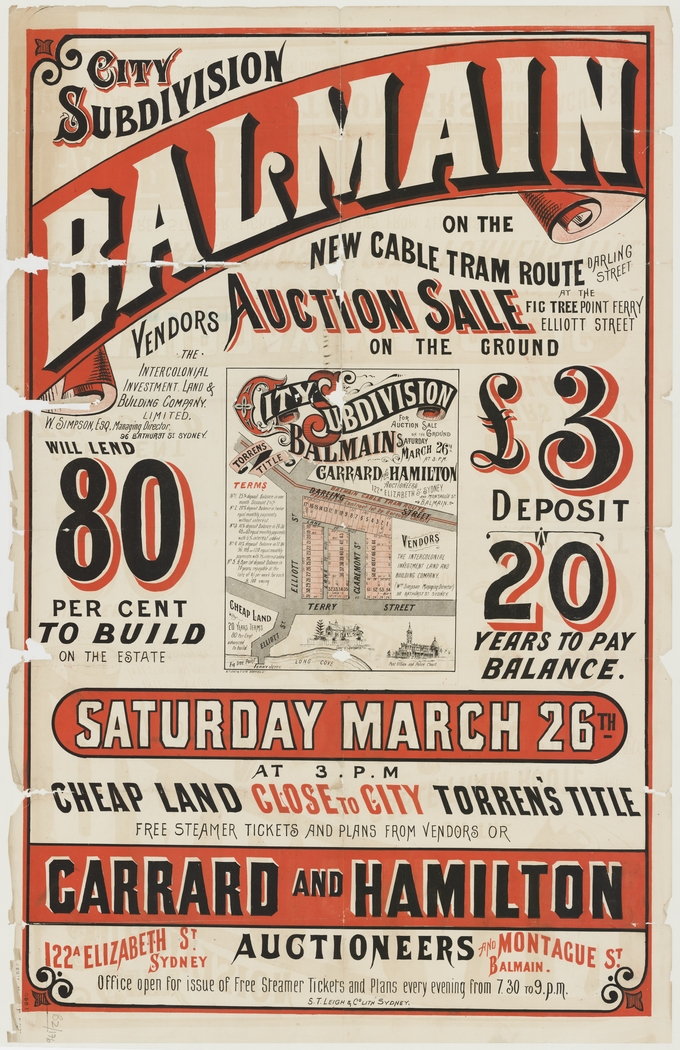
Early City Subdivision Balmain, Darling St, Elliott St, Terry St, Claremont St

=== Industry ===
The peninsula changed rapidly during the 1800s and became one of the premier industrial centres of Sydney. Industries clustered around Mort Bay included shipbuilding, a metal foundry, engineering, boilermaking and the Mort's Dock & Engineering Company works which opened in 1855—in 1958 Mort's Dock closed and is the site of Mort Bay Park. Increasing industrialisation at Balmain created a demand for cheap housing. This was satisfied by the dock owners selling small blocks of land to entrepreneurs who then built tiny cottages and rented them to the workers. The Balmain Reservoir was built in 1915.

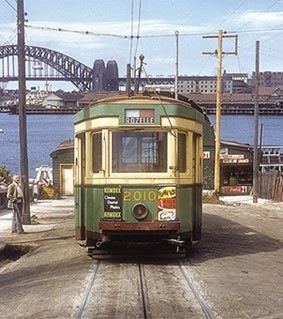
An electric tram at Balmain East ferry wharf in 1951

Lever Brothers Factory, owned by the British parent company, opened in 1895.

=== Colliery ===
A coal mine was opened in 1897 beside what is now Birchgrove Public School by an English company. The winding engine was said to be the largest in the southern hemisphere. However, with the endless labour disputes, Sydney Collieries Limited took over ownership. A further new shaft was sunk in 1904. From the bottom of the shafts a decline led down to a seam of coal situated under the harbour between Ballast Point and Goat Island. Because of the availability of the coal, Balmain Power Station was erected in stages from 1909. However, there were major industrial disputes in the 1920s and calls were made by some shareholders in 1928 to close the mine. The following year the colliery still employed 299 miners. By 1930 the colliery owners had given up and it had been taken over by the Balmain Coal Contracting Company, established by the Miner's Federation to keep the pit operational, to no avail as disputes continued. On 13 October 1930 the Miners' Lodge declared the mine "blacked" as well as the manager, whose dismissal they demanded. The colliery closed in 1931. In 1933 it was proposed to extract natural gas for commercial use from the now disused mine. In 1936 calls were made for the Sydney City Council to take over the mine to no avail.

One local waterman who benefited from the Balmain coalmine was Bob Miller, who resided at 102 Glassop Street. He purchased a small tug and barge and secured a contract to remove the mine tailings, which he on sold to local councils as fill for a handsome profit. This was the beginning of the RW Miller industrial conglomerate. By 1924 his family had moved to Louisa Road.

=== Tramway ===
The opening of the tramway in the 1920s further established Balmain and it gained a reputation as a rough working-class area of Sydney. A large influx of immigrants boosted Balmain's population in the 1950s.

=== Gentrification ===
Gentrification of Balmain began in the 1960s as industry waned. Balmain's desirability to the middle class was due in part to its waterfront location and proximity to Sydney's CBD. The Balmain Association was formed in 1965. There were strong pressures for redevelopment from the years prior to 1971.

Increasing property values and waterfront development continued to push the suburb's remaining industry out. In 1996, the Lever Brothers site became a series of apartment complexes with a handful of original buildings preserved. The power station was demolished in 1998 to make way for apartments. However, many aspects of Balmain's industrial past have been retained as heritage.

== Heritage listings ==
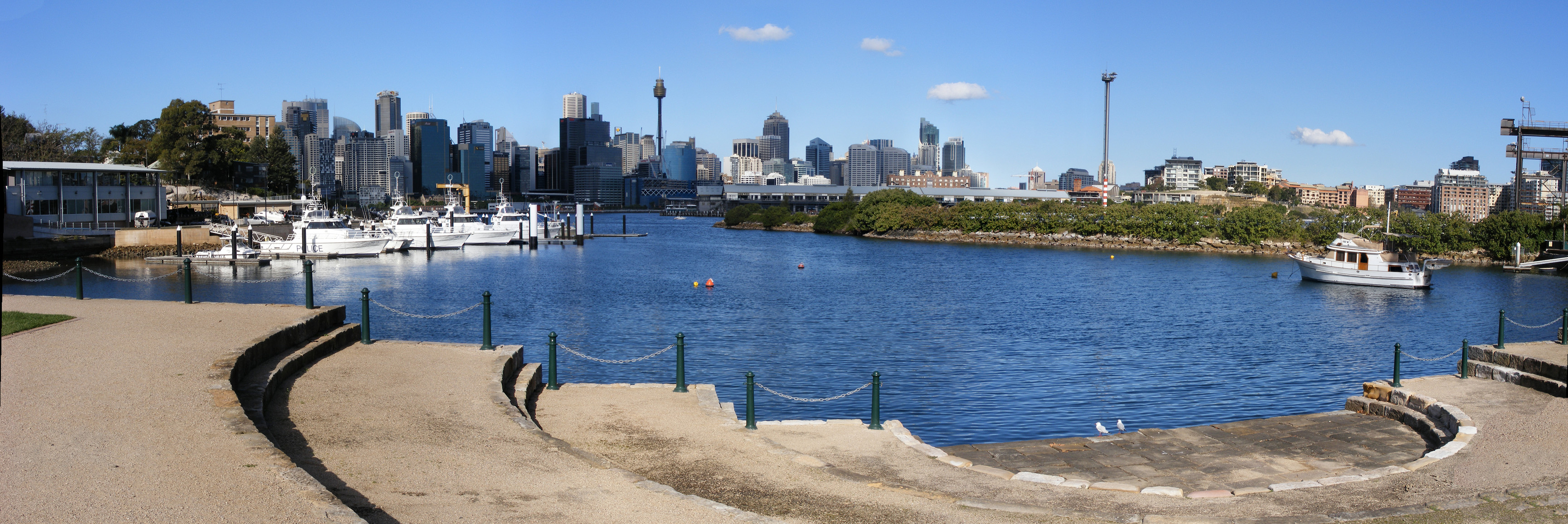
View over Sydney from Balmain

Balmain has a number of heritage-listed sites, including:

- 1 Blake Street: Ewenton
- Booth Street: Balmain Hospital Main Building
- Glassop Street: Dawn Fraser Swimming Pool
- 12b Grafton Street: Hampton Villa
- 37 Nicholson Street: Waterview Wharf Workshops
- Thames, Mort, College, McKell, Cameron, Yeend Streets: Mort's Dock
- 2 Wells Street: Louisaville

== Demographics ==
At the 2021 census, the population of Balmain was 10,454. At the 2016 census, it had a population of 10,453.

In 2021, 64.8% of people were born in Australia. The next most common countries of birth were England 9.1%, New Zealand 2.8%, United States 1.7%, Ireland 1.3% and China 1.2%. 83.4% of people only spoke English at home. Other languages spoken at home included Mandarin 1.5% and Italian at 1.2%. The most common responses for religion in Balmain were no religion 51.9%, Catholic 20.7%, Anglican 9.9%, not stated 5.3% and Eastern Orthodox 2.2%. 37.6% of dwellings were flats, units or apartments, 39.9% were semi-detached terraced houses or townhouses and 21.8% were separate houses.

== Commercial area ==
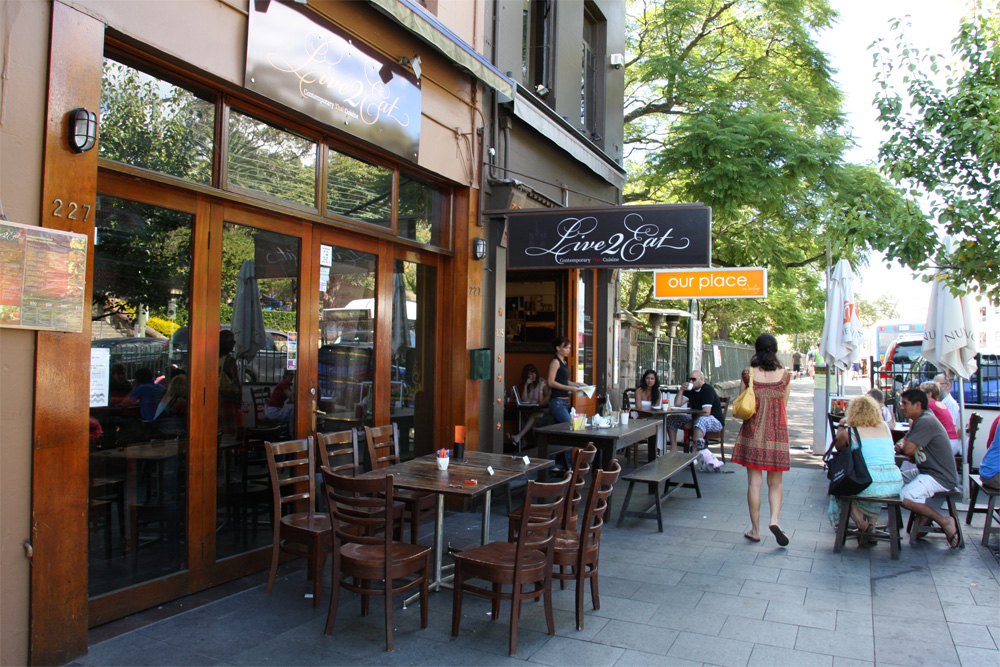
Balmain features an abundance of alfresco cafes and dining establishments, giving a prominent dining culture to the area

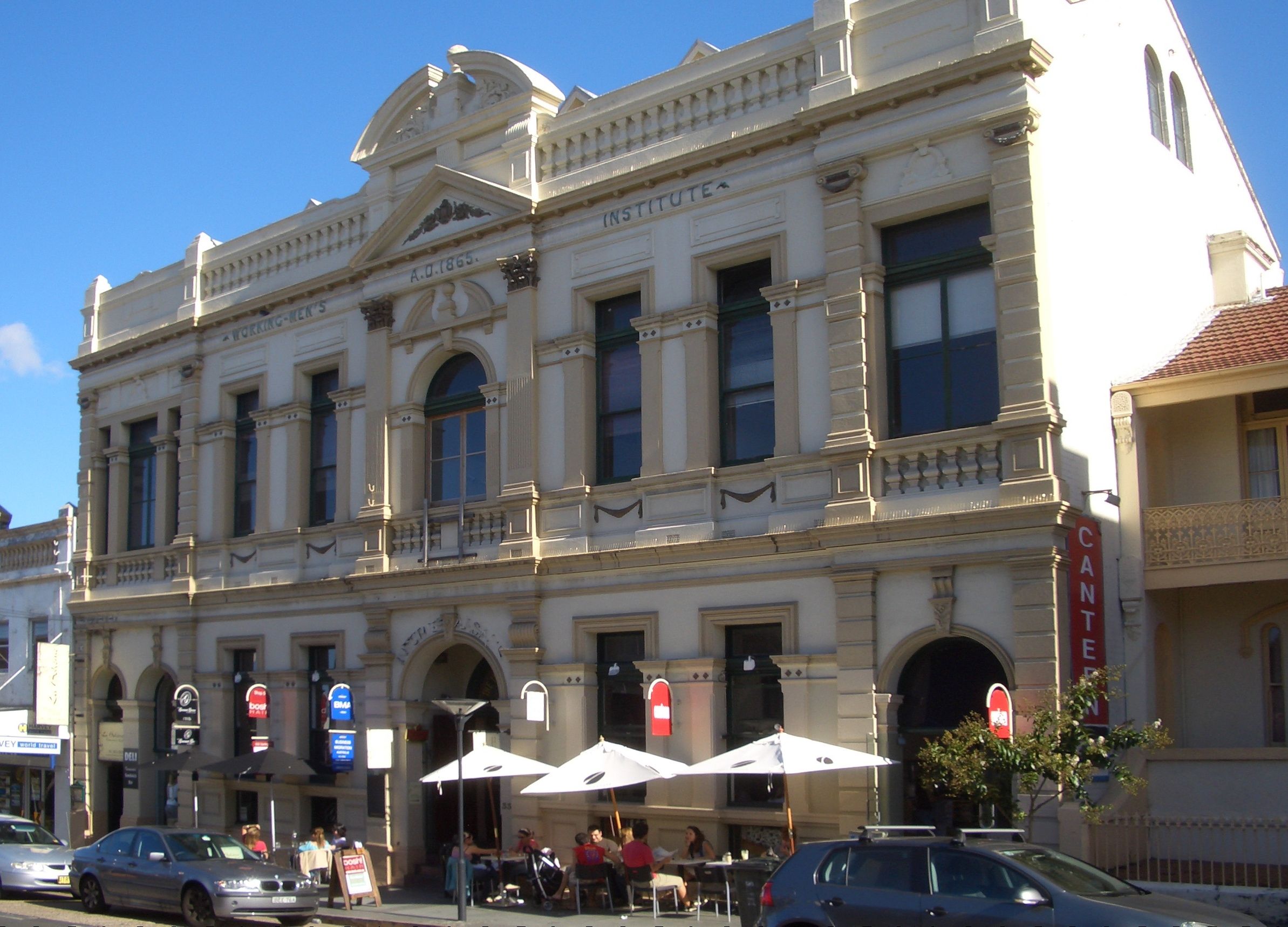
Balmain Working Men's Institute

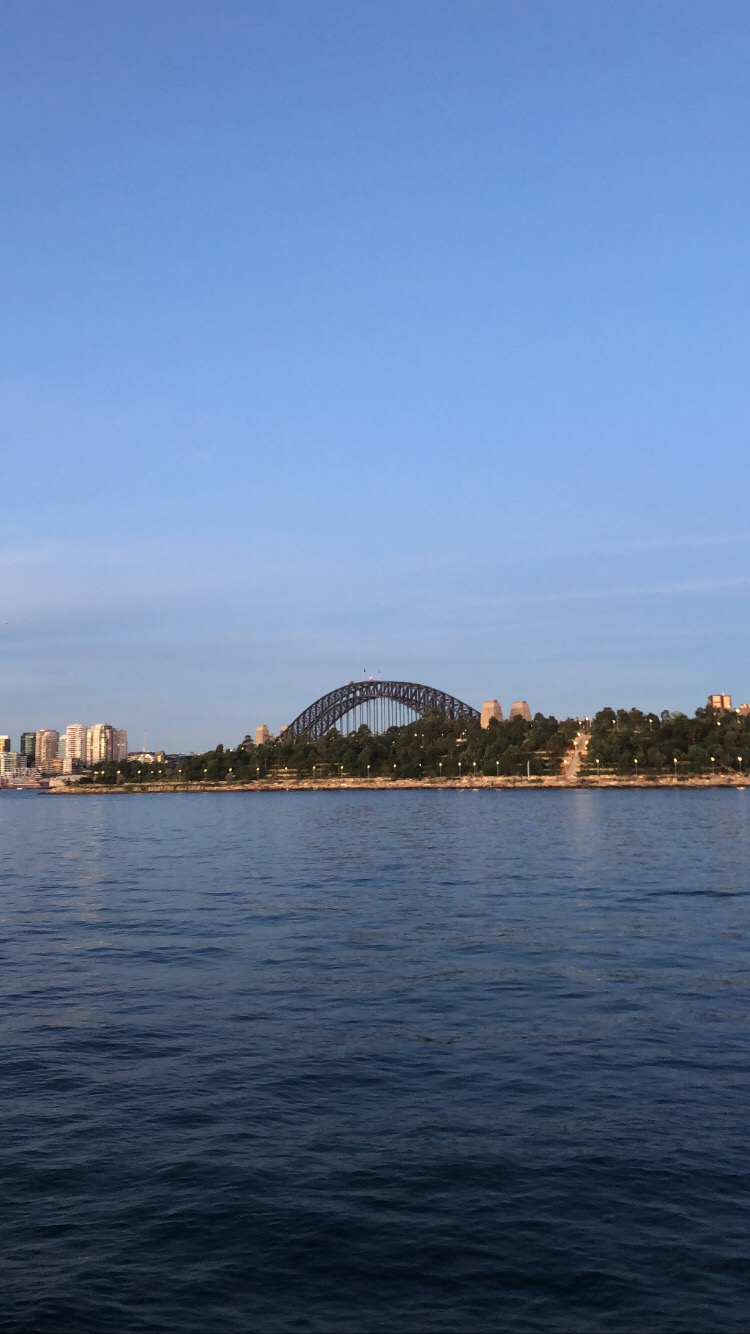
View of the Sydney Harbour Bridge from East Balmain, Barangaroo Reserve is in the foreground

Darling Street, Balmain's main thoroughfare, features boutique shops, quality restaurants and cafes alongside old drinking establishments. Landmarks on this street include the Post Office and Court House, alongside Balmain Town Hall, the historic Westpac Bank, Balmain Fire Station and Balmain Working Men's Institute. Other commercial developments are scattered throughout the suburb. The headquarters of the NSW Water Police moved to Cameron Cove in Balmain in late 2007.

== Transport ==
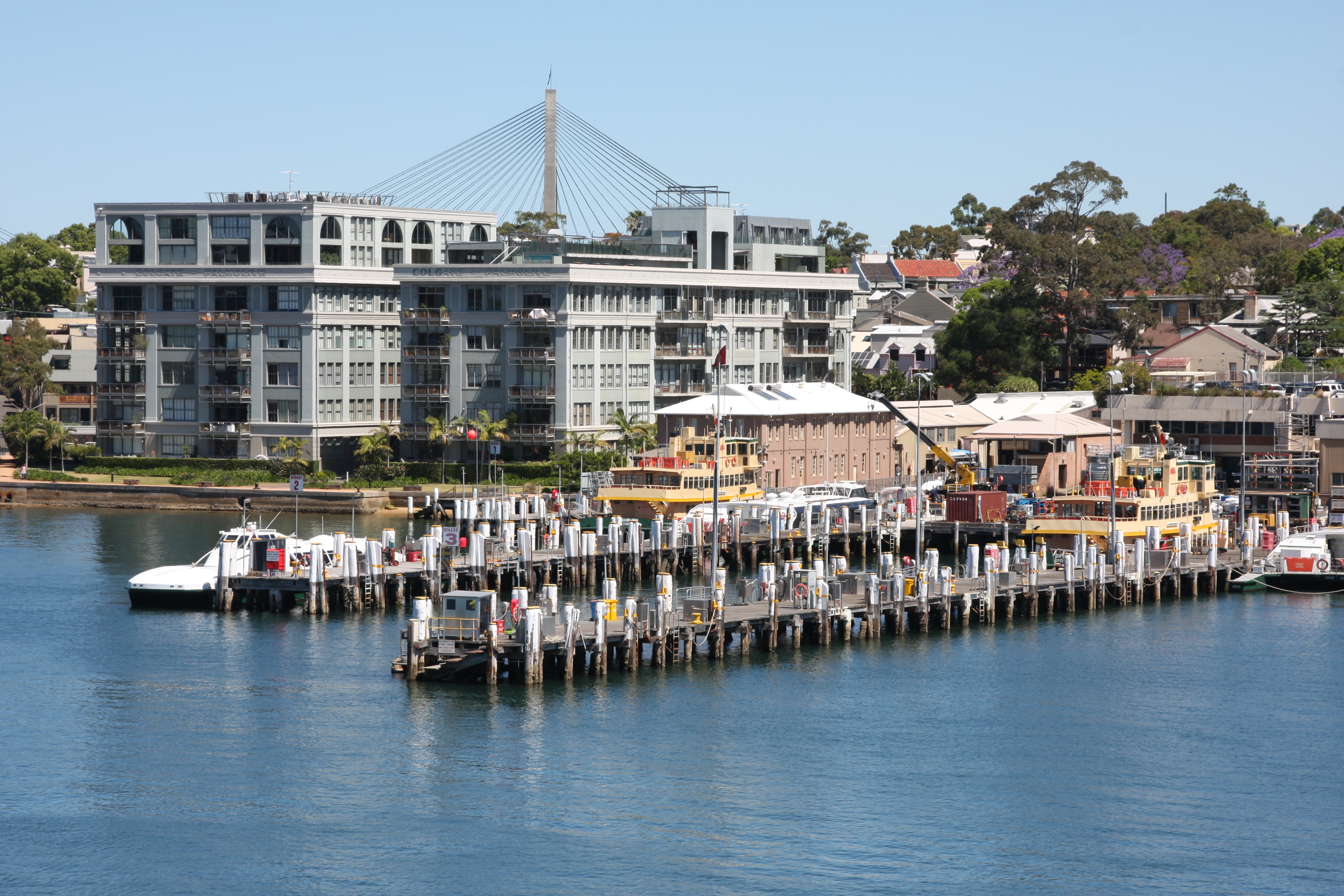
Balmain Shipyard

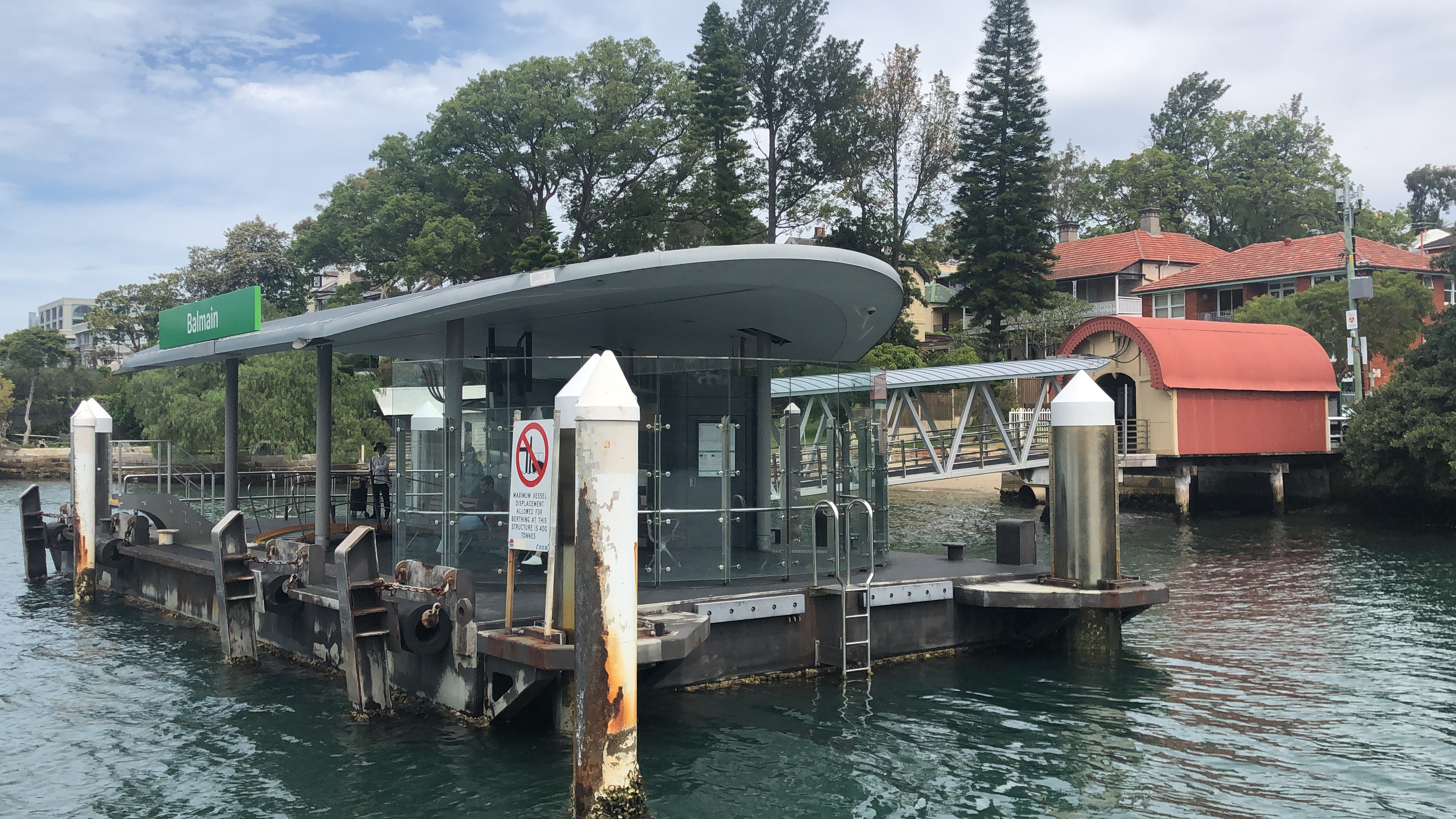
Balmain Ferry Wharf

Balmain has several ferry wharves including Thames Street Balmain serviced by the Cockatoo Island ferry services, Elliot Street, Balmain West and Darling Street, Balmain East serviced by the Cross Harbour ferry services. Services run to Circular Quay. Transdev Sydney Ferries' maintenance and repair base is at Balmain Shipyard.

Balmain's road network feeds into three main roads—Darling Street, Beattie Street and Montague/Mullen Street. These streets have limited speeds, typically 40 km/h and are all single carriageway with parallel parking. Due to the geography of the peninsula, all of these roads feed into Victoria Road and the Western Distributor. Sections of Balmain were to be demolished to make for the North-West Expressway but this was prevented after green bans were placed by the NSW Builders Labourers Federation.

Trams once ran all the way down Darling Street to the wharf at Balmain East. Due to the very steep incline at the bottom of the street, the trams used a complex 'dummy' counterweight system constructed under the road surface. The trams were pushed up the steep hill by the dummy, and rode the dummy on the way down to safely descend the hill. Transit Systems bus services that service Balmain are:

- 433 Balmain to Railway Square.
- 441 Birchgrove to Art Gallery of New South Wales,
- 442 Balmain to the Queen Victoria Building
- 445 Balmain to Campsie

== Culture ==
The Balmain bug (Ibacus peronii), a type of slipper lobster commonly eaten in Sydney, is named after Balmain.

=== Historic hotels ===
Balmain is home to many historic hotels, including the Cat and Fiddle Hotel, Cricketer's Arms Hotel, Dick's Hotel, Dry Dock Hotel, Exchange Hotel, Forth & Clyde Hotel, Kent Hotel, Unity Hall Hotel, London Hotel, Mort Bay Hotel, Norfolk Pines Hotel, Pacific Hotel, Royal Oak Hotel, Shipwright's Arms Hotel, Star Hotel, Town Hall Hotel, Volunteer Hotel and the West End Hotel.

The Riverview Hotel is a heritage-listed corner building built in 1880 in the Arts and Crafts style. Between 1888 and 1913 the pub was named Bergin's Hotel after the publican Joseph Bergin. Australian swimming champion Dawn Fraser was publican of the Riverview from 1978 to 1983.

=== Pop culture ===
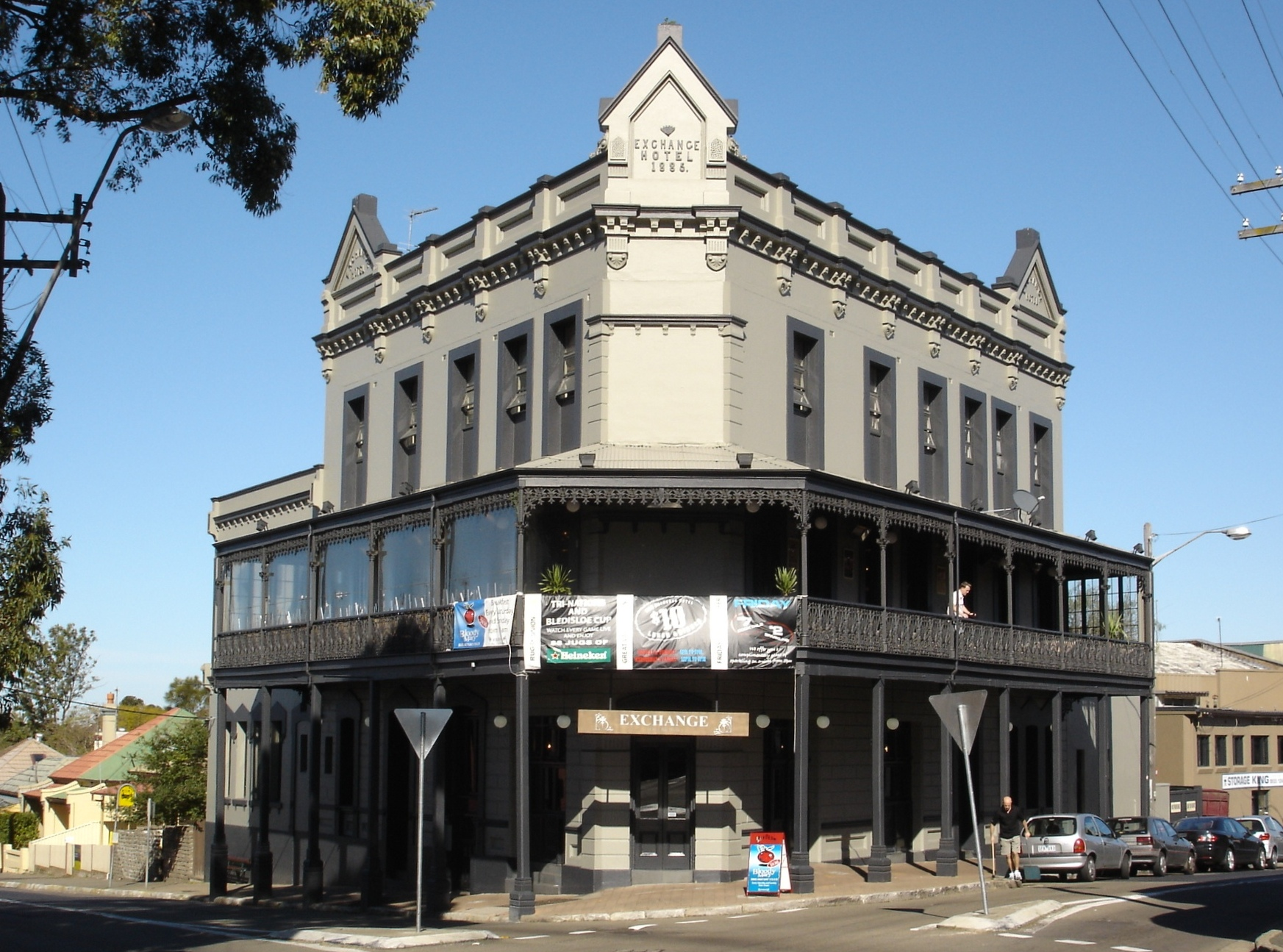
Exchange Hotel, Beattie Street

Numerous phrases have been used to describe the suburb and its inhabitants, including "Balmain boys don't cry" (former NSW Premier Neville Wran at the Street Royal Commission); "You can take the boy out of Balmain, but you can't take Balmain out of the boy" (Unknown); "There are only two types of men in this world: those who were born in Balmain and those who wish they were" (a Police Commissioner of New South Wales). Australian Prime Minister Paul Keating commented on the suburb's gentrification by using the term "Basket weavers of Balmain". Until the 1970s, older Balmain people would refer to travel into the city centre as "going to Sydney". The Post Office/Court/Police building and vicinity is generally referred to as the "Town Hall", with the Post Office clock often called the Town Hall clock. This was probably due to the Post Office & Court Building being built in between the earlier Town Hall & Town Hall Hotel.

In the mid-1960s Balmain was the setting for the popular Seven Network situation comedy series My Name's McGooley, What's Yours?, starring Gordon Chater, John Meillon and Judi Farr.

Balmain was the setting for the 1994 Australian film The Sum of Us, which starred Jack Thompson, John Polson and Russell Crowe.

The former Pacific Hotel (from 2019, now converted into a residential property) - as well as several other locations in Balmain - were used extensively as the set of the Australian television soap opera, E Street.

=== Parks and reserves ===
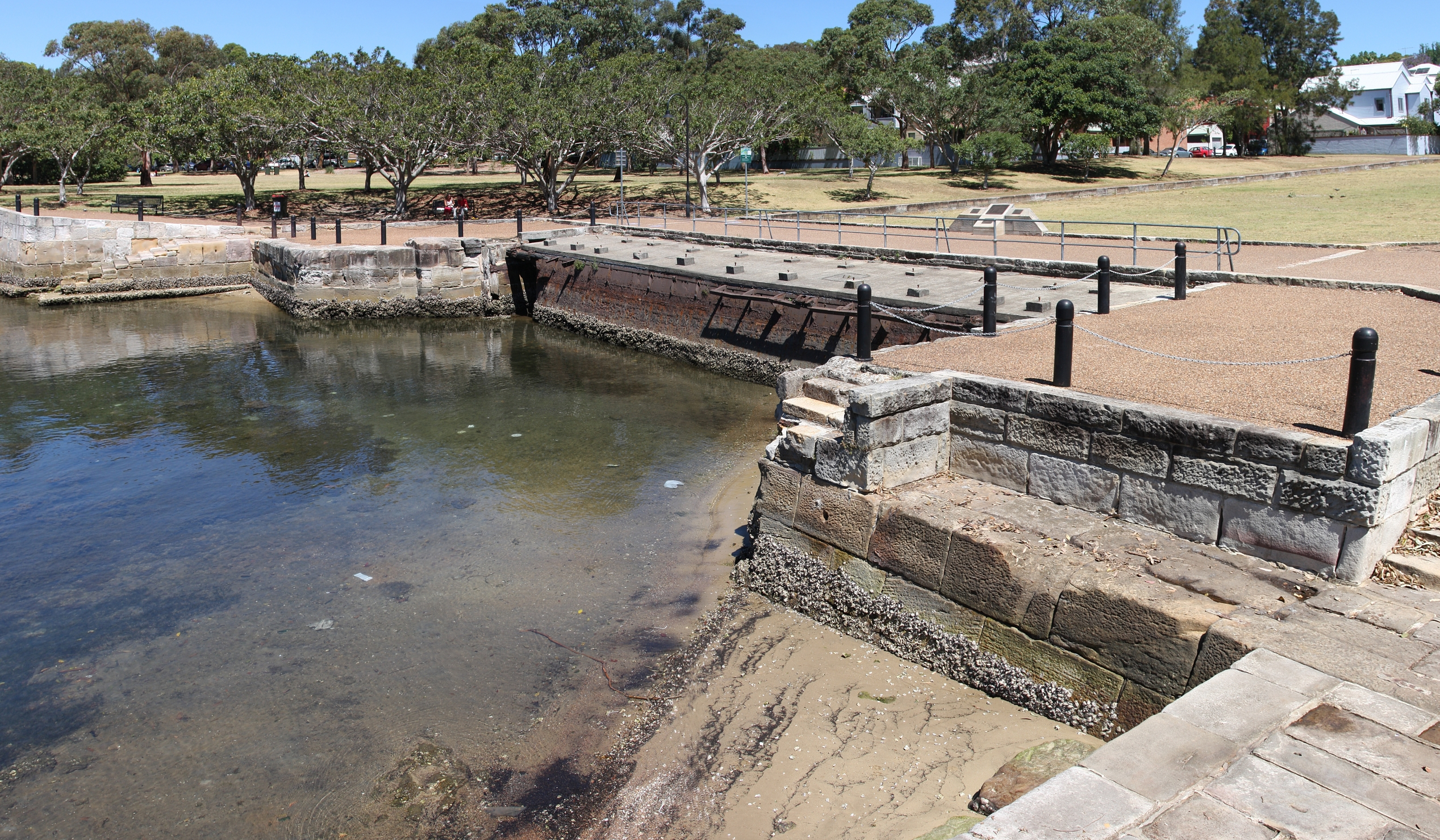
Public open space on the shores of Mort Bay on the Balmain, Balmain East border

Balmain has a number of parks including Gladstone Park, Birrung Park and White Bay Park. The wider peninsula has many more parks in close proximity, particularly along the foreshores. In earlier times Punch Park was the goto place for park footy (rugby league), though it was always referred to by the boys then as Punch's Park

=== Sport and recreation ===
Balmain is home to the Balmain Tigers district rugby league football club that is now represented in the NRL by Wests Tigers rugby league club. The club was formed in mid-1999 by a joint venture between the Balmain Tigers and the Western Suburbs Magpies in preparation for the 2000 season. In 2005 the Tigers defeated the North Queensland Cowboys in the Grand Final to win the premiership.

The Balmain Rugby Football Club, founded in 1873, took part in the very first competition structure, winning its first premiership in 1875. The loss of players fighting in World War I led the club to merge with the Glebe "Dirty Reds" RUFC in 1919 to form the Glebe-Balmain RFC. As a merged club, they won four premierships during the 1920s. In 1931, as a depression-era project, Drummoyne Oval, as it is now known, was constructed on the site of a small oval which Glebe and Balmain had used for junior matches since 1892. To ensure continuity of tenure, and because there were not enough sporting grounds in Sydney, the Glebe-Balmain Club changed its name to the Drummoyne District Rugby Football Club. It did so without abandoning its traditions, retaining the scarlet jumpers of Glebe and its nickname, "The Dirty Reds", and the black and gold of Balmain, colours still worn by today's players in their socks. Drummoyne Rugby Club is still in existence and continues to uphold its history and traditions.

The suburb is also home to the Balmain Australian Football Club, a founding member in 1903 of the Sydney Football League.

Balmain is also home to Balmain FC, who are a semi-professional football club, playing in the National Premier Leagues NSW 3. In 2015 they qualified for the Australia-wide FFA Cup Round of 32 and were drawn against A-League club Melbourne Victory FC in which they were defeated 6–0 in front of 5,000 fans at Leichhardt Oval.

Balmain Sailing Club is located in nearby Birchgrove and is home to the annual Balmain Regatta.

Balmain Rowing Club was formed in July 1882, and still occupies its original White Street location. The club adopted black and yellow colours from its formation, which soon became the district colours. The great Illawarra sculling champion Bill Beach had a close association with the club and wore their black and gold colours in competition.

== Housing ==
The post-industrial gentrification of Balmain has resulted in a suburb of considerable charm and interest where the modest, pretty houses command high prices. However, Balmain still retains a diverse mix of residents due to the Housing Commission unit blocks in the suburb. Much of the suburb is a heritage conservation area and creative design is required to modernise the Victorian and Edwardian housing stock. In 2013 a contemporary Balmain house designed by architect Harry Seidler sold for $6m. The Tom Uren House in Gilchrist Place was designed by Richard Leplastrier.

== Notable residents ==
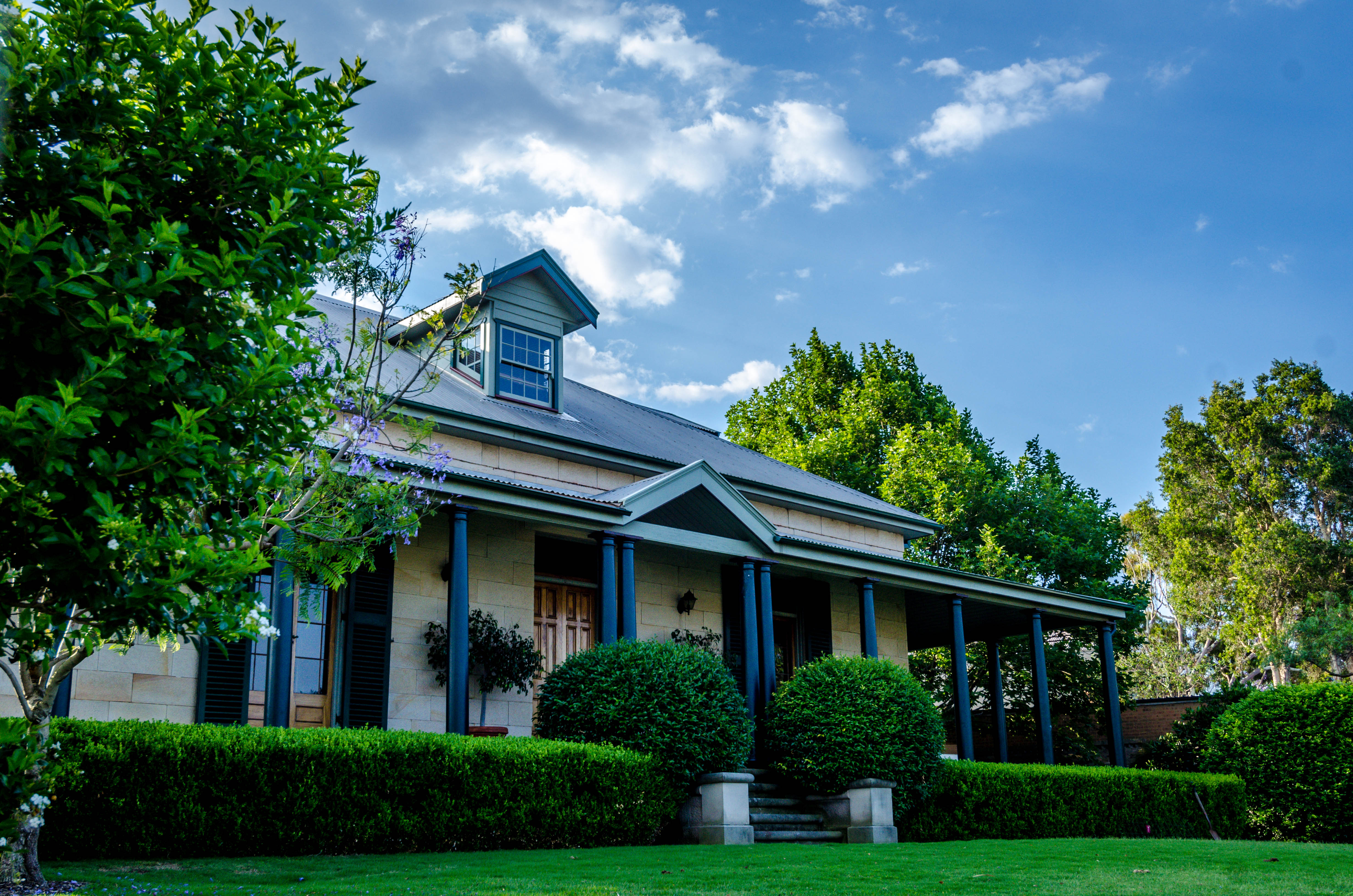
Henry Parkes residence Hampton Villa

Notable past and present residents include:

- Sir Harold Alderson, sports administrator
- Peter Bonsall-Boone, LGBT rights activist
- Edgar Britt, jockey
- Geraldine Brooks, author and journalist
- Rose Byrne, actress
- Clive Caldwell, RAAF's highest scoring fighter ace of WWII
- Thomas Coutts, whaler, pastoralist and mass murderer
- H. V. Evatt, jurist, judge, lawyer, politician, parliamentarian and writer
- Carlotta, entertainer
- Dawn Fraser, former champion swimmer and politician
- Caroline Grills, serial killer
- Billy Hughes, Prime Minister of Australia from 1915 to 1923
- Archie Jackson, Australian cricketer
- Sir John Kerr, Governor-General of Australia from 1974 to 1977
- Alex Lloyd, singer and songwriter
- Lottie Lyell, actress
- Padraic McGuinness, journalist
- Lenny McPherson, criminal
- Dally Messenger, rugby union and rugby league player
- Robert W. Miller (businessman), Industrialist, shipping, mining & brewing
- Matthew Mitcham, diver
- Frank Moorhouse, author and screenwriter
- George Negus, journalist and author
- Nick Origlass, former Trotskyist mayor of Leichhardt Municipal Council
- Henry Parkes, seventh Premier of New South Wales
- Wayne Pearce, former professional rugby league footballer
- Josh Pyke, musician
- Norman Selfe, engineer
- Fred Spofforth, Australian cricketer
- Frank Sponberg, Australian rugby league player
- Rick Springfield, singer-songwriter and actor
- John Storey, 20th Premier of New South Wales
- Tom Uren, Whitlam government Minister
- Neville Wran, 35th Premier of New South Wales
- Malcolm Young, musician
- Sir Thomas Henley, KBE, member of NSW Legislative Assembly and Mayor of Drummoyne

== Notes ==
1. Postcode 2041 covers the suburbs of Balmain, Balmain East and Birchgrove.
2. Combined population for all residents of postcode 2041.
3. Median house price for all properties of postcode 2041.
