= List of hotels in Australia =

The following is a list of notable hotels in Australia:

== Australian Capital Territory ==
Name	Image	Location	Summary	References
Hotel Canberra		Yarralumla	The hotel dates from the 1920s and is 1 kilometer away from the Parliament House.	
Hotel Kurrajong		Barton	The hotel was built between 1925 and 1927 as a hostel to house public servants in preparation for the relocation of Parliament from Melbourne. The building was designed as an example of the garden pavilion style by the Commonwealth's chief architect, John Smith Murdoch.	
Old Canberra Inn		Canberra	The original slab hut was built in 1860 by Joseph Schumack and in 1876 it was licensed as an inn. It was a coach stop on the Yass to Queanbeyan run until 1887 when it was sold to John Read. It became the Read family home until 1974, called The Pines until it was renovated and relicensed as the Old Canberra Inn. Its entry on the National Register of Heritage Places was rejected owing to the extensive refurbishments done to the building.	
QT Canberra		Civic	QT Canberra is a luxury boutique hotel in Australia's capital, Canberra. The building, steeped in history, where politicians socialized and held behind-the-scenes meetings, underwent a redesign led by creative director Nick Graham. The hotel's interiors combine modern technology, unique artwork and the extraordinary atmosphere of Parliament.	

== New South Wales ==
Name	Image	Location	Summary	References
Australia Hotel		Sydney CBD	The hotel was located on Castlereagh Street, Sydney until its closure on 30 June 1971. It was the premier hotel in Sydney, describing itself as "The Hotel of the Commonwealth". Its foundation stone was laid by Sir Henry Parkes in 1889. The hotel had a large entrance onto the street in polished granite, the stairs grey, the doric columns red. In 1968 the Hotel Australia was purchased by MLC who, with mounting concern, announced their intention of refurbishing and maintaining one of the city's landmarks. However, the following year they announced its impending closure and later demolished it in almost record time.	
Cremorne Point Manor		Cremorne Point	A 4-star boutique hotel with 29 rooms at Cremorne Point, designated by the government of New South Wales as a North Sydney Heritage.	
Dick's Hotel		Balmain	The hotel was built in 1872 on the corner of Beattie and Montague Streets in Balmain, an inner-west suburb of Sydney, It was known as Lean's Hotel from 1886 to 1898 when owned by Jabez Lean. It was associated with the political movements of the late nineteenth century, especially the growing labour movement.	
Exchange Hotel		Balmain	Last pub to be built during the local boom of the 1880s.	
Grace Hotel		Sydney	Built by Kell & Rigby during the late 1920s and opened in 1930 by Grace Bros as its headquarters. It was inspired by the neo-Gothic Tribune Tower in Chicago but the building was of the Art Deco architectural style and had state-of-the-art innovations and facilities for the time. The building was purchased for redevelopment in 1995 by the Low Yat Group of Malaysia. Since June 1997, it has been used as a luxury hotel, "the Grace Sydney".	
Harbour Rocks Hotel		The Rocks	This four-star hotel since 1989 is a heritage-listed 55-room boutique hotel situated in the precinct of The Rocks, in Sydney. It also houses the Lanes Restaurant & Bar on the lower level, complete with an outdoor terrace.	
Hydro Majestic Hotel		Medlow Bath	The land on which this hotel was built was purchased in 1902 by famed businessman Mark Foy. It was originally built as a grand and opulent health and wellness retreat, and was known as Belgravia Hotel at that time. The hotel was badly damaged during a bushfire in 1921, and soon underwent a renovation. The hotel fell into decline during the late 90's and early 2000's. In 2008 it was purchased by Huong Nguyen and George Saad who undertook an extensive renovation costing $30 Million AUD. It reopened in 2014 with the renovations completed.	
Newport Arms Hotel		Newport	The Newport Arms Hotel was renamed to The Newport in 2015. Established in 1880, the town was visited by both Prince Albert and the future King, Prince George (King Charles' great-grandfather) in 1881. Only 24 km from the Sydney CBD, The Newport attracts impressive reviews.	
Rabbit Trap Hotel		Albert	Although established in 1929, the Rabbit Trap Hotel has only had a rabbit trap on its roof since 2013. It was placed there in order to attract interest to the heading-for-abandoned outback town of Albert, New South Wales, located 120 km west of Dubbo.This certainly succeeded, with the town featuring in a TV show, a rural magazine, and a daily newspaper in Sydney. The name of the hotel was inspired by Joliffe's cartoon, Saltbush Bill.	
Sebel Townhouse Hotel		Darlinghurst	The hotel opened in 1963. In the 1960s, it gained “an international reputation for its intimacy and attentiveness” and became popular with artists.	
Star City Casino		Pyrmont	A casino-hotel that opened on September 13, 1995	
White Bay Hotel		White Bay	Closed in 1992 and burned down in 2008.	

== Northern Territory ==
Name	Image	Location	Summary and references
Victoria Hotel		Darwin	The hotel opened on 8 September 1890. It was first called The Royal Hotel but was renamed the North Australian Hotel a few days after opening. It was renamed the Victoria Hotel in 1896.

== Queensland ==
Name	Image	Location	Summary	References
Regatta Hotel		Brisbane	The historic hotel located on the corner of Coronation Drive and Sylvan Road in the Brisbane suburb of Toowong and faces the Brisbane River. The first hotel was established on the site in 1874, as a single-storey wooden building. The Regatta Hotel is classified by the National Trust of Queensland and was entered in the Queensland Heritage Register in 1992.	
The Reef Hotel Casino		Cairns	The hotel has 128 rooms.	
The Star Gold Coast		Gold Coast	It is casino and hotel complex in the suburb of Broadbeach on the Gold Coast, situated next to the Nerang River. Opened in February 1986, it is operated by The Star Entertainment Group. It is connected to the Oasis Shopping Centre via a monorail. The seven acre complex includes eight bars, conference facilities, a ballroom and a theatre. In 2006, A$53 million was spent on refurbishment of the casino. In 2008 all 442 hotel rooms were completely refurbished at the cost of A$16 million.	
Palazzo Versace Australia		Gold Coast	The luxury hotel is located on the Southport Spit at Main Beach on the Gold Coast. Formerly Palazzo Versce, The Imperial Hotel has 200 hotel rooms and suites and seventy-two neighbouring condominiums, three restaurants and a private marina. The main building was designed by chief architect Rocco Magnoli in Postmodern architecture style in a broad interpretation of Neoclassical architecture.	
Buchanan's Hotel		Townsville	The hotel was located on Sturt Street from 1903 to 1939 and was owned by David Buchanan, a first-generation Scottish immigrant who owned multiple hotels in his lifetime. During World War II it housed American officers. Tragically the hotel caught fire and was destroyed in 1982.	
Holiday Inn, Townsville		Townsville	The building was originally constructed in 1976 on the site of the famous old "Central Hotel" which was cleared in 1973.	

== Tasmania ==
Name	Image	Location	Summary	References
Hotel Grand Chancellor, Hobart		Hobart	The hotel opened in 1987 as the Sheraton Hobart Hotel and was transferred to the Grand Hotels International group in 1993.	Hotel Grand Chancellor, Hobart
Wrest Point Hotel Casino		Hobart	The hotel opened in its present form on December 5, 1939 and was considered “one of the most modern establishments of its kind in Australia”. Became the first legal casino in Australia.	
Hotel Grand Chancellor, Launceston		Launceston	The hotel is a seven-story building located in the city's central business district (CBD). Built in the 1980s with the concept of “the largest commercial development in Launceston's history”.	Hotel Grand Chancellor, Launceston

== Victoria ==
Name	Image	Location	Summary	References
Hotel Windsor		Melbourne	Opened in 1884, the hotel is Melbourne's only surviving purpose-built Victorian 'grand' hotel. The Windsor was one of the first known grand hotels.	
The Langham		Melbourne	Built in 1992, the hotel was called Sheraton Towers Southgate, renamed The Langham Hotel in 2005. The five-star hotel is part of the Langham Hotels International chain, which is owned by Hong Kong real estate company Great Eagle Holdings.	
Shamrock Hotel		Bendigo	A grand XIX century hotel in Bendigo, Victoria. The Shamrock Hotel is one of the city's major landmarks, with significant historical and architectural significance to Australia and Victoria. The building forms part of an important townscape and is part of a collection of late Victorian buildings of similar style.	

== Western Australia ==
Name	Image	Location	Summary	References
Crown Perth		Burswood	It is located on the Swan River near the city of Perth, and is owned by Crown Limited. The complex includes a 24-hour casino, seven restaurants, eight bars, a nightclub, two international hotels (a luxury 5-star InterContinental and a 4-star Holiday Inn), a convention centre, theatre and the Burswood Dome.	
Palace Hotel		Perth	A significant three-story heritage building located in the city's central business district. Originally built in 1897 as a hotel during the gold rush, later converted into offices and banking chambers, and reopened as a hotel on March 18, 1897.	
Raffles Hotel		Applecross	A hotel designed in the functionalist style of the interwar period, and one of the few examples of a hotel in this style. Continuously operated as a hotel since 1896.	
Rendezvous Hotel Perth Scarborough		Scarborough	A high-rise beach hotel, originally known as Observation City, the hotel was built in the 1980s by the Bond Corporation to accommodate visitors to the 1987 America's Cup held off the coast of Perth.	

== See also ==
- Lists of hotels, sorted by country
- List of public hotels (pubs) in Australia
