= SASC =

SASC can refer to:

- Small Arms School Corps
- United States Senate Committee on Armed Services
- South American Sailing Confederation
- South Australian Supreme Court
- Sydney Amateur Sailing Club
