= Hotel Grand Chancellor =

Hotel chain in Australia and New Zealand

- Type: Hotel
- Industry: Hospitality
- Headquarters: Australia; New Zealand
- Products: Temporary residence
- Parent: Grand Hotels International
- Website: Official Website

Hotel Grand Chancellor is a hotel chain that operates throughout Australia and New Zealand.

== History ==
The Hotel Grand Chancellor, Christchurch was severely damaged in the February 2011 Christchurch earthquake, and was believed to be in an imminent state of collapse. The hotel at 26-storeys was the tallest building in Christchurch.

The hotel was searched and no survivors or bodies found. Demolition began in December 2011 and was completed by May 2012.

== Hotels ==
=== Open ===
Australia

- Adelaide
- Adelaide (branded as The Chancellor on Currie)
- Brisbane
- Hobart
- Launceston
- Melbourne
- Townsville

New Zealand

- Auckland City
- Wellington (branded as James Cook Hotel Grand Chancellor)

=== Closed ===
Australia

- Palm Cove

New Zealand

- Christchurch
