= Meadow Mews =

Shopping centre in Kings Meadows, Tasmania, Australia

- Location: Kings Meadows, Tasmania
- Coordinates: 41°27′53″S 147°09′40″E
- Opened: 1987
- Owner: Plaza
- Num. of stores: 34 or more
- Num. of anchor tenants: 1
- Floors: 1
- Website: www.meadowmews.com.au

Meadow Mews is the third or fourth largest shopping centre in Tasmania and is Five kilometres from Launceston. Originally before being Meadow Mews Plaza, it was Meadow Mews, Meadow Mews Centro, now Meadow Mews Plaza, there has being many changes to the shopping centre and many stores shutting down due to the cost of rent. Major shopping stores are in the shopping centre as Coles, Bakers Delight, Telstra, Zambrero, Specsavers, Wendy's, Just Jeans, JustCuts, Banjo's Bakery Cafe, Australia Post, Celebrations (alcohol store), Smokemart and Giftbox and other various stores.

In 2020, Coles raised A$30K for FightMND.

In 2026, Zambrero opened up a new store in the shopping centre replacing Donut King after shutting down. It is currently still under construction.
