= Cremorne Point Manor =

Hotel in Sydney, New South Wales, Australia

Cremorne Point Manor

- Cremorne Point Manor in 2012

- Location within east Sydney
- Former names: Redcourt; 8 Cremorne Road

General information
- Type: 4 star Boutique hotel
- Location: 6 Cremorne Road, Cremorne Point, Australia
- Coordinates: 33°50′40″S 151°13′46″E

Design and construction
- Designations: North Sydney Heritage

Website
- CremornePointManor.com.au

Cremorne Point Manor in 2006

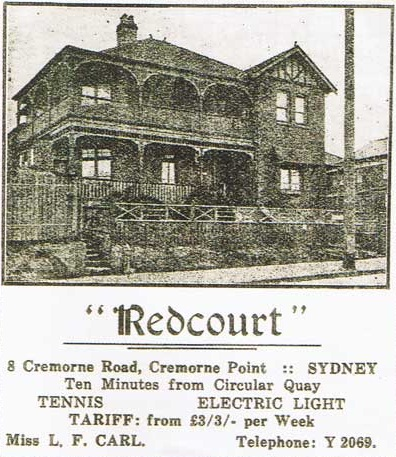
Redcourt advertisement in 1927/28

Cremorne Point Manor is a 4 star boutique hotel in North Sydney, Australia. It is established in a 19th-century federation style 2 story building on Cremorne Road, Cremorne Point, which has been designated by the government of New South Wales as a North Sydney Heritage.

== History ==
Cremorne Point Manor was once a guesthouse named Redcourt. According to a tourist guide advertisement of 1927/28, one Miss L. F. Carl was a contact person for Redcourt. Public records show that the 19th century federation style 2 story building used to be 8 Cremorne Road until the property was split in a deed in 1988, then it became 6 Cremorne Road. The building overlooks Cremorne Point and Mosman Bay. It was once restored, later renovated and modernised, but maintains its 19th-century federation style.

As Lex Hall wrote in the Weekend Australian of 24–25 February 2007, "The hotel is believed to have been built in the late 1880s, when a coal seam was discovered in Cremorne. Fortunately, the plan to mine the seam was scotched, thanks to stiff opposition from locals. Cremorne Point Manor has been a guesthouse for about 50 years".

In July 2012, indexing of the Cremorne Point Manor brand was approved by IP Australia; the trademark number is 1504272. Cremorne Point Manor has 29 rooms.
