= Banjo's Bakery Cafe =

Australian bakery chain

- Type: Private
- Founded: 1984
- Founder: Mark Saxby
- Area served: Tasmania, Mainland Australia
- Products: Baked goods, coffee, Pies
- Website: www.banjos.com.au

Banjo's Bakery Cafe is an Australian bakery and cafe originating from the island state of Tasmania. Since the 21st century, Banjo's Bakery Cafe has opened stores on Mainland Australia. There is currently roughly 51 to 52 Banjo's Bakery Cafe stores operating across Australia.

== History ==
Mark Saxby opened the first bakery in 1984 in Yorktown Square, Launceston, Tasmania near the Hotel Grand Chancellor. Since 1985, the chain started opening more bakeries in regions like Hobart, Devonport, and Burnie across Tasmania. Just after 5 years of operating the business, it opened its first bakery on Mainland Australia in Neutral Bay, Sydney, New South Wales. Since the opening on Mainland Australia, it has opened in South Australia and Queensland in the settlement of Cleveland in Queensland.

In 2024, Banjo's Bakery Cafe celebrated 40 years of the bakery chain.

The bakery chain has roughly 5 stores in Queensland that recently a third new store opened in Townsville on 20 October, 2026.

Banjo's Bakery Cafe has opened stores in other locations in Tasmania in the 2010s and 2020s such as in Brighton.

== Original location ==
Original location of the first Bakery in Yorktown Square, Launceston, Tasmania

The original bakery that first opened was in Yorktown Square in Launceston near the Hotel Grand Chancellor in Tasmania. The bakery had a Red and white brick building with some Chairs and tables outside of the building. Sometime around the 2000s or 2010s, the original location closed and moved onto Brisbane Street at the one-way section of Brisbane Street so the bakery would get more customers.

== Products ==
The bakery chain sells baked goods and pastries. Different bakeries will sell different products while other bakeries may not sell the different products.

- Pies: typically Party Pies, Meat Pies, Potato Pies, Scollop Pies, and more.
- Donuts
- Drinks: typical drinks like Coffee, Coca-Cola, Pepsi, Milk, Chocolate Milk, Strawberry Milk, and more.
- Bread: typical Breads like White bread, gluten free bread, and more.
