= Hotel Grand Chancellor, Christchurch =

Four-star hotel in the centre of Christchurch in New Zealand

Coordinates: 43.5328°S 172.6390°E

Hotel Grand Chancellor
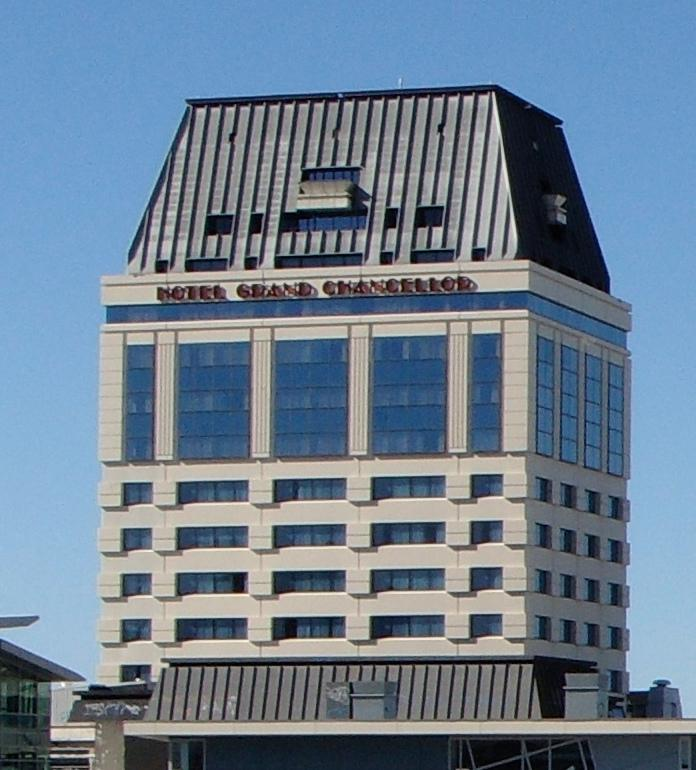
- Hotel Grand Chancellor in 2010
- Alternative names: Grand Chancellor Hotel

General information
- Type: Commercial
- Location: Christchurch Central, New Zealand
- Completed: 1986
- Renovated: 1995
- Demolished: 2012
- Owner: Grand Hotels International

Height
- Height: 85 meters

Design and construction
- Developer: Don Forbes
- Main contractor: Forbes Construction

Renovating team
- Renovating firm: Fletchers Construction

The Hotel Grand Chancellor (also known as the Grand Chancellor Hotel) was a major four-star hotel in the centre of Christchurch in New Zealand, one of eleven Hotel Grand Chancellor establishments across Australasia. Until 2010, it was the city's tallest building standing at 85 metres (279 ft) and 21 storeys, until it was overtaken by the 86.5 metres (284 ft) tall Pacific Tower.

The Hotel Grand Chancellor was built in 1986 for office use by Forbes Construction. In 1995 it was converted to a hotel by Fletchers Construction with 15 floors of hotel accommodation, and 12 floors of car parking, also housing conference facilities for businesses.

The building was severely damaged in the 2011 Christchurch earthquake, causing a visible lean on the south-east corner of the building. The fragile state of the structure created challenges during the search and rescue effort, with risk of collapse threatening City Mall and the surrounding area.

Demolition work began in November 2011, using a complicated deconstruction method starting from the roof and working down. Initial plans to rebuild the hotel on the same site were scrapped in 2014, and the original site was repurposed for retail space. In 2019, Grand Central announced plans to build a new, smaller hotel in a different part of the city.

== Construction and design ==
The Hotel Grand Chancellor building was originally developed as an office tower by Don Forbes in 1986. It was constructed using reinforced concrete.

In 1995, the tower was bought by Singapore-based Grand Hotels International, and was refitted as a hotel. It included 176 rooms and a carpark.

== Christchurch earthquakes ==
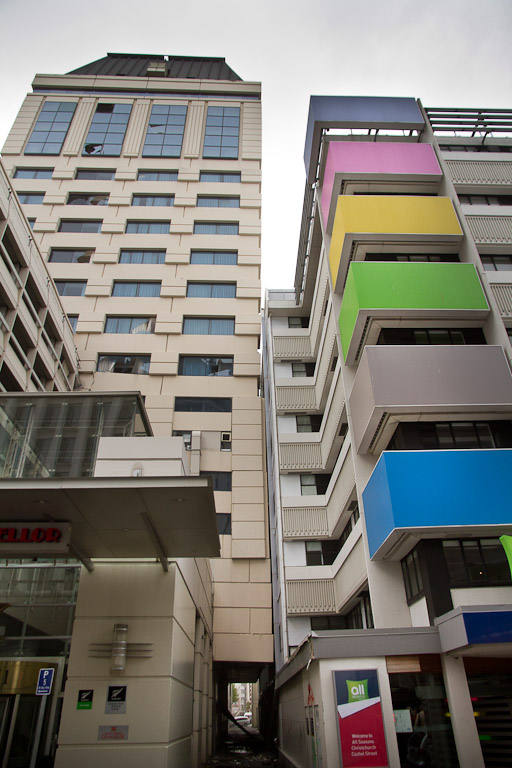
A visible lean can be seen in this photo taken minutes after the 2011 Christchurch earthquake occurred

The hotel survived the September 2010 earthquake and reopened shortly after, but was badly damaged by the February 2011 Christchurch earthquake five months later.

The collapse of a key supporting shear wall "D5-6" located in the south-east corner of the building led to the visible leaning of the building to one side. It also contributed to the staircases (above level 14) collapsing. The southeast corner had dropped 800mm, putting the tower on an estimated 1.3 meter lean. Investigations found the building had vertical and horizontal irregularities and the failed shear wall was too slender; an initial inquiry by the Canterbury Earthquakes Royal Commission questioned whether the structure failed to meet 1980s building standards.

Above the 14th floor, 36 people were trapped and spent several hours in the damaged building during a series of large aftershocks, before being all successfully rescued.

Fear that the building would totally collapse hampered search and rescue missions in the vicinity, and also raised concerns about how to safely demolish the tower if it remained standing. The building was eventually stabilised using steel jackets wrapped around damaged columns and concrete pads to support the structure. On 4 March it was decided the building would be demolished over the following six months using a complicated deconstruction processes from the top downwards. The roof of the hotel was removed in early November 2011. A protective fence was built around the building to catch debris from the demolition of the concrete frame, which began in January 2012. The project was undertaken by Ward Demolition.

== Rebuild ==
The Grand Hotels International, owners of the former Hotel Grand Chancellor, Christchurch gained city council approval to rebuild on the site. The new hotel would have been on base isolators at 50 metres (160 ft) high and have 12 floors in the hotel and 5-floor office block in the front. The new design was from Warren and Mahoney architects and was to be built by Fletcher Construction, and finished by 2015.

In April 2014, it was announced that the hotel would not be rebuilt on its original site, and would be replaced by shops and offices instead. The Grand Hotels International group expressed interest in building the hotel on a different site in the city.

In September 2019, Grand Central confirmed that a replacement hotel would be on a new site on the southwest corner of Manchester and Armagh streets.

In April 2025, G2 Studio, the architect for the new hotel, released a render showing the proposed building in its new site. It will be a 3–4 star hotel, will be on the corner of Manchester and Armagh streets, and is in the resource consent phase.

== Legacy ==
As one of the biggest buildings in Christchurch at the time, and due to the dramatic visual of the tower leaning, the Hotel Grand Chancellor became a widely published subject of the 2011 Christchurch earthquake.

Pieces of twisted steel rod from the building have been preserved by Canterbury Museum as part of their earthquake collection.

In February 2020, Prime TV debuted Help Is On The Way, a documentary about the tower and the rescue effort.

== See also ==
- List of tallest buildings in Christchurch

Records
Preceded by Rydges Hotel (former Noah's)	Tallest building in Christchurch; 1986–2010	Succeeded by Pacific Tower
