= The Reef Hotel Casino =

Casino in Cairns, Australia

Coordinates: 16°55′24″S 145°46′45″E

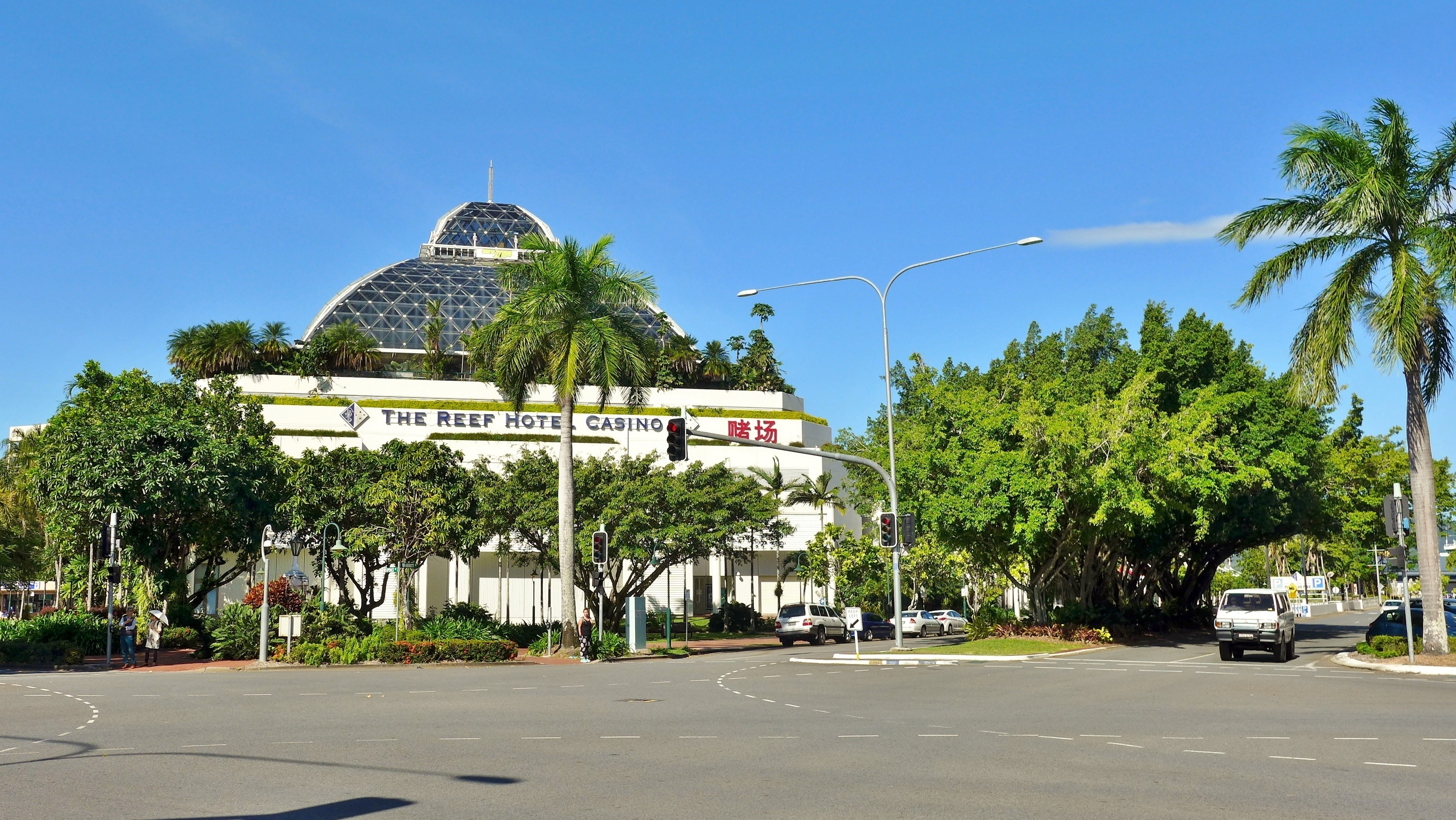
- Interactive map of The Reef Hotel Casino
- Location: Cairns City, Queensland
- Owner: Casinos Austria International Limited and Accor Casino Investments (Australia) Pty. Ltd.
- Website: https://www.reefcasino.com.au/

The Reef Hotel Casino or Pullman Reef Hotel Casino is the only casino in Cairns, Queensland, Australia.

The hotel has 128 hotel rooms and is jointly owned by Casinos Austria International Limited and Accor Casino Investments (Australia) Pty. Ltd.

The complex features a central LED pillar and interactive floor which is prominent next to BAR36. The bar hosts free live entertainment 5 nights a week and serves food from 4pm-8pm every night. The Reef Hotel Casino also houses the Merchant Artisan Food & Coffee cafe plus four restaurants: Tamarind, Café China Noodle Bar (in the former Cairns Customs House), Cafe China Restaurant and Flinders Bar & Grill.

It also hosted the Cairns Zoom & Wildlife Dome on the rooftop, until it was closed in October 2023. The Cairns Zoom & Wildlife Dome featured a number of native Australian species including koalas, sugar gliders, red-legged pademelons, rufous bettongs, saltwater crocodiles, freshwater crocodiles, water monitor, scrub python, eastern short-neck turtle, red-tailed black cockatoos, double-eyed fig parrots, tawny frogmouths, laughing kookaburras and many other species.

== History ==
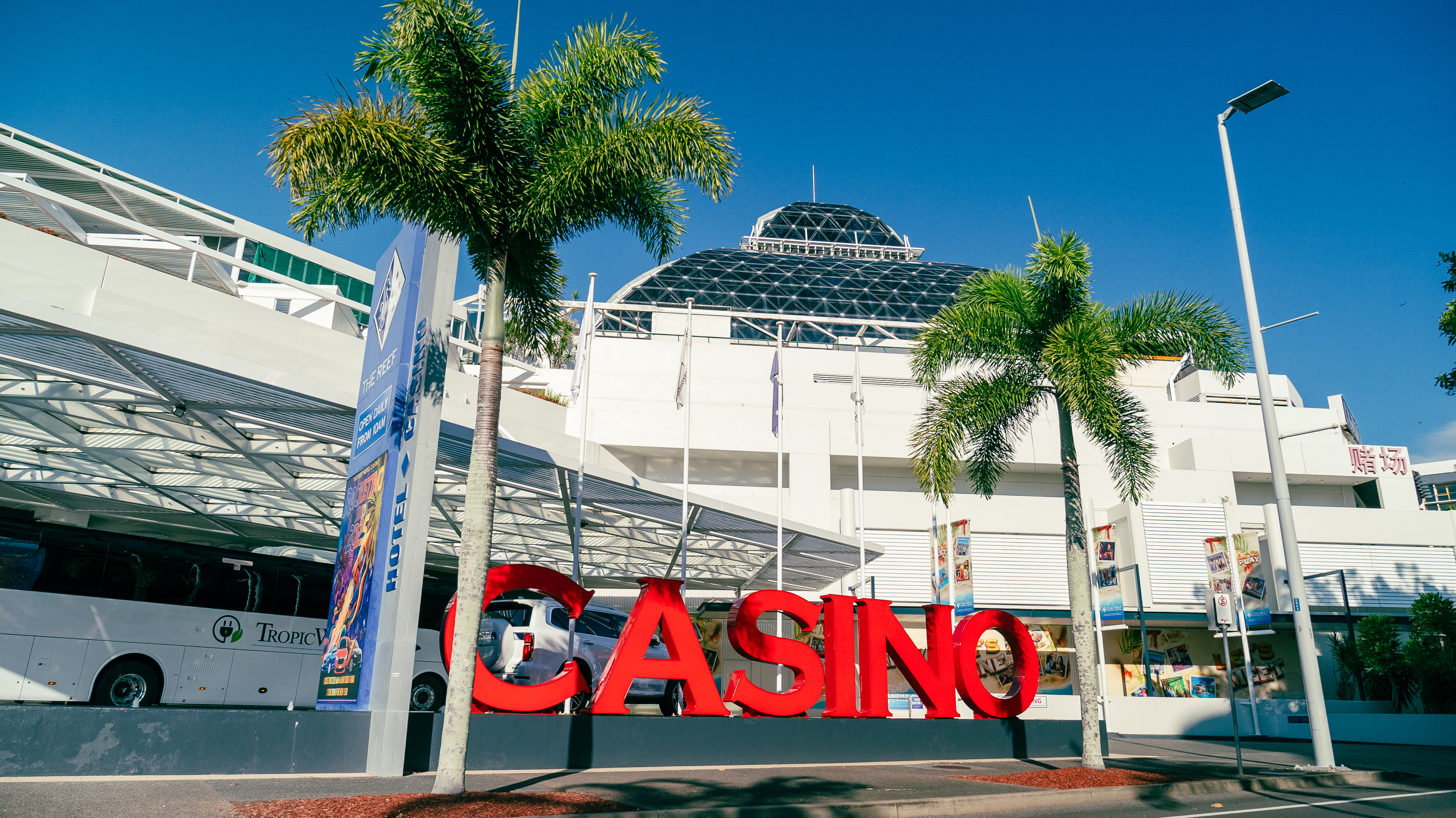

The Queensland Government called for submissions from interested parties to build and operate a casino in Cairns in January 1992. Casino licence was granted in January 1996. Reef Casino Hotel commenced trading on 31 January.

In 2022, operators of the casino were fined for paying a junket tour operator to bring patrons to the venue.

== See also ==
- List of casinos
- List of hotels in Australia
- List of zoos in Australia
