= Cairns Customs House =

Historic building in Queensland, Australia

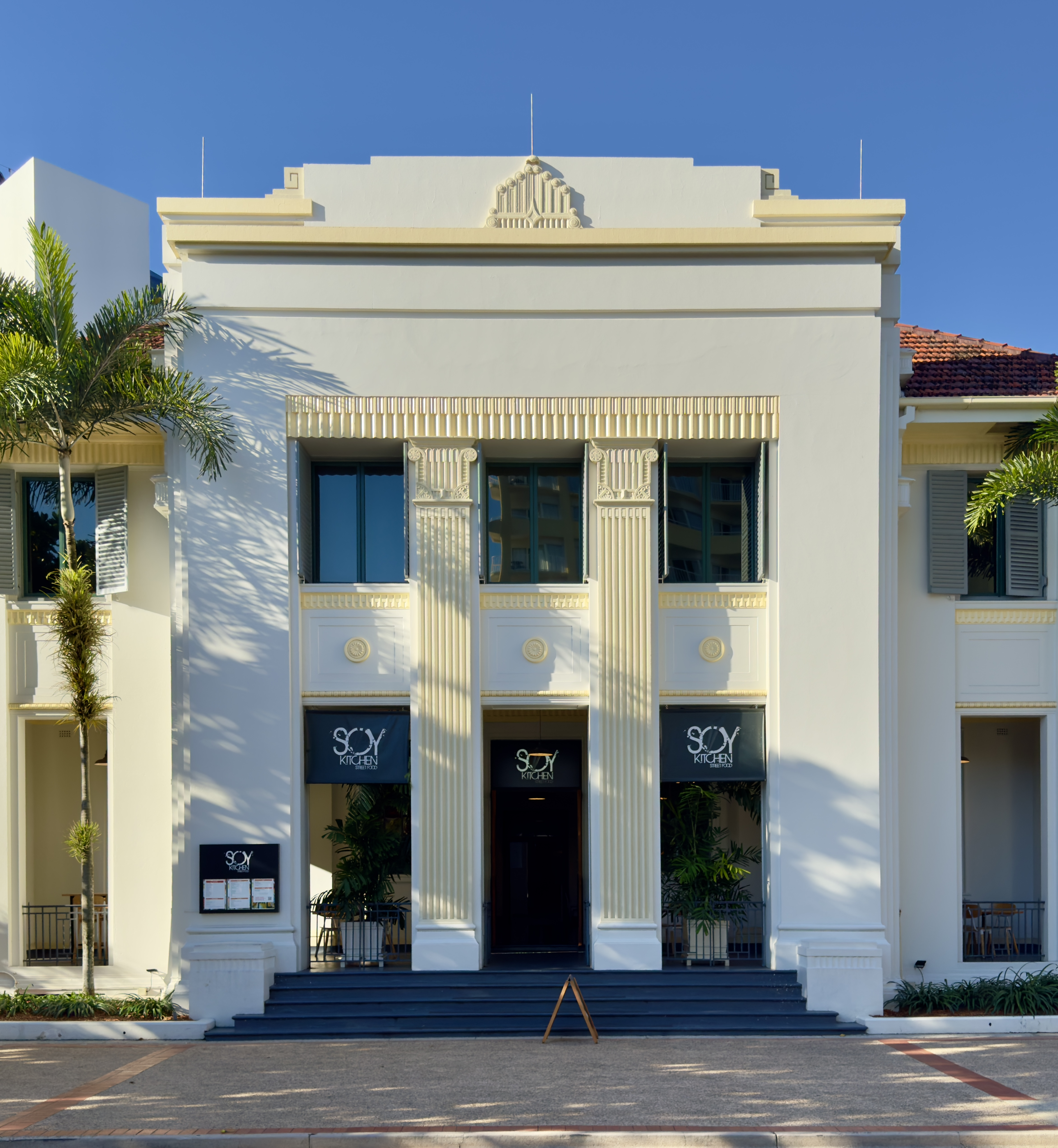
- Cairns Customs House, 2025

- Location within Queensland Location within Australia
- 16.9235°S 145.7791°E
- Location: 6A–8A Abbott Street, Cairns City, Cairns, Cairns Region, Queensland, Australia

History
- Design period: 1919–1930s (interwar period)
- Built: 1936–1937

Queensland Heritage Register
- Official name: Cairns Customs House (former)
- Type: state heritage (built)
- Designated: 21 October 1992
- Reference no.: 600377
- Significant period: 1930s, 1940s
- Significant components: customs house, shed/s, trees/plantings, garage, store – bond
- Builders: Watkins & Deal

Cairns Customs House is a heritage-listed former customs house and now restaurant at 6A–8A Abbott Street, Cairns City, Cairns, Cairns Region, Queensland, Australia. It was designed by Robert Henry Bowen and built from 1936 to 1937 by Watkins & Deal. It was added to the Queensland Heritage Register on 21 October 1992.

== History ==
The former Cairns Customs House was erected in 1936–37 by the Australian Government through the Public Works branch of the Department of the Interior, largely as an employment-generating initiative during the Great Depression. It was the third customs house on the site.

The customs reserve at Cairns was the first land surveyed after proclamation of the port of Cairns on 1 November 1876. The reserve of just over 1.2 hectares (3.0 acres) included the whole of the land bounded by Abbott, Spence and Wharf Streets and the Esplanade.

By July 1877 the first customs buildings were completed at what was then known as Trinity Bay, but the site was not proclaimed a customs reserve (temporary) until 1886. The buildings faced the Esplanade, and included a customs house, bond store and the sub-collector of customs' residence.

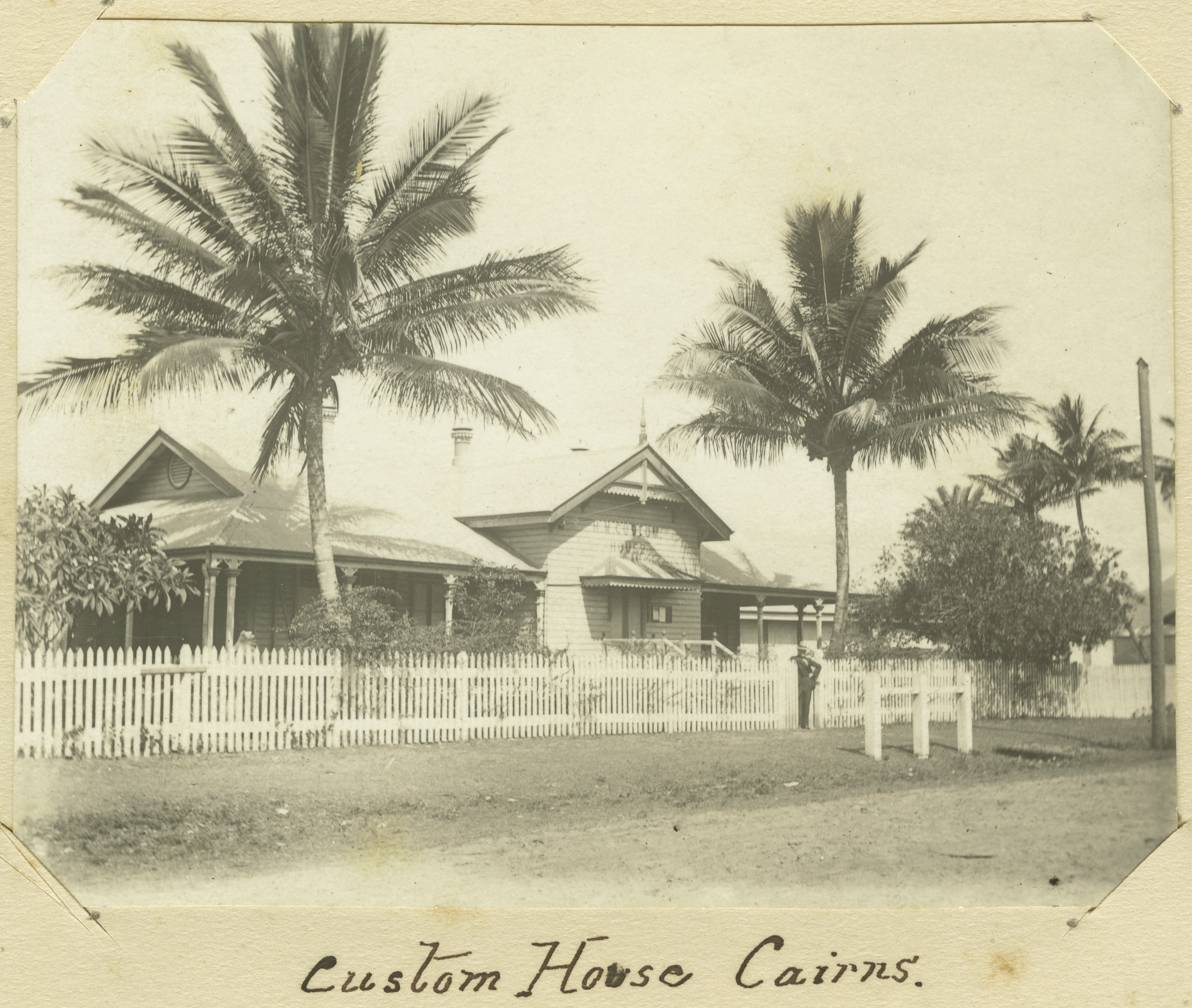
Cairns Custom House, circa 1905

In 1889 a new, single-storeyed timber building with a frontage to Abbott Street replaced the first customs house, which was converted to a bond store. In the same year the site was proclaimed a permanent reserve for customs purposes.

As part of the Federation of Australia, the customs reserve became the property of the Australian Government, and was occupied by the Department of Trade & Customs. In 1905 it was subdivided into three allotments, two being revested with the state government. Allotment 2, with frontages to the Esplanade and Abbott Street, became customs reserve R.293. This site contained the 1889 customs house and a bond store (1876 customs house). The latter was extended in the early part of the twentieth century.

The present Customs House was constructed on the site during the large-scale interwar redevelopment of Cairns, in which the city centre was virtually rebuilt. This building boom was in part a consequence of severe cyclone damage suffered by the city in 1920 and 1927. Also it was a reflection of a developing economy sustained by the introduction of a post-1918 Soldier Settlement Scheme to the Atherton Tableland, and the opening of the North Coast rail link between Cairns and Brisbane in 1924. Cairns became the northern terminus of the coastal railway, and functioned as a service town for sugar, mining, maize, dairying, timber and fruit growing.

By the late 1930s, Cairns had become the third largest port in Queensland.

Plans for a two-storeyed masonry customs building were prepared by architect Robert Henry Bowen of Commonwealth Public Works, Queensland, in 1936. The ground floor contained offices, and the upper floor provided residential accommodation for the sub-collector of customs. It was constructed in 1936–37 by local building contractors Watkins & Deal, at a cost of £8,500.

The building was erected on the same Abbott Street site as the preceding customs house, which was relocated to the backyard to provide temporary office accommodation while the new building was being constructed. The 1889 building was removed/demolished at a later date.

Plans for a new bond store on the site were prepared in mid-1939. The first customs house/bond store appears to have been removed to accommodate the new building, which was erected by 1941.

In 1970 the first floor residence in the customs house was vacated to accommodate increased office staff, and in 1989 the customs department removed to a new building in Aplin Street.

Between 1986 and 1991 the bond store was occupied by the Queensland Government's National Parks and Wildlife Service. The site was purchased by Suncorp in 1987.

In 1992, the Queensland Government called for submissions to build and operate a casino in Cairns on the site. The Cairns Customs House became part of the development of The Reef Hotel Casino where it now operates as a Soy Kitchen Street Food, an Asian restaurant.

== Description ==
The former customs reserve occupies a 2,656 square metre site at the southern end of the city centre, with frontages to Abbott Street (the principal commercial axis) and the Esplanade. The main building of The Reef Hotel Casino is built around it.

=== Former Customs House (1936–37) ===
An inter-war two-storeyed rendered cavity brick building, with hipped terracotta tiled roof. The building is square in plan with a projecting entrance portico and balcony. The entrance facade to Abbott Street is decorated with moulded details that are classically derived including double height pilasters, which rise to a stepped parapet. On the upper level of the Abbott Street elevation all the openings have timber shutters. All the windows and French doors in the building are multi-paned.

Internally the ground floor contains the Long Room and four offices, with the upper floor being residential accommodation of seven principal rooms. All the rooms on both levels open out onto verandahs and balconies. The building contains most of its original finishes and fittings. The Long Room has a decorative moulded plaster cornice and pilasters. All the joinery throughout the building is silky oak.

=== Former Bond Store (c. 1940) ===
Designed to complement the former Customs House, the former Bond Store is a single-storeyed rendered cavity brick building, with a suspended concrete slab floor and a terracotta tiled roof. The interior has been renovated.

The grounds contain a number of mature shade trees and the site also includes garages and sheds.

== Heritage listing ==
The former Cairns Customs House was listed on the Queensland Heritage Register on 21 October 1992 having satisfied the following criteria.

The place is important in demonstrating the evolution or pattern of Queensland's history.

The former Cairns Customs House is important in demonstrating the evolution and pattern of Cairns' history, the site being associated with the earliest European settlement of the Trinity Bay area and with the development of Cairns as the principal port in far northern Queensland. The present buildings were associated with the administration of customs operations at Cairns for over 50 years.

The place is important in demonstrating the principal characteristics of a particular class of cultural places.

The former Cairns Customs House is important in demonstrating the principal characteristics of an interwar custom house employing classical motifs.

The place has a strong or special association with a particular community or cultural group for social, cultural or spiritual reasons.

The site and buildings are valued for social and historic reasons by the Cairns community, as part of an historic government precinct which includes the adjacent Anzac Memorial Park and reserve R.886.
