= Newport Arms Hotel =

Historic hotel in Pittwater, Australia

- Interactive map of the Newport Arms Hotel area

General information
- Status: Completed
- Location: Pittwater, Sydney, New South Wales, Australia
- Coordinates: 33°39′37″S 151°18′32″E
- Opened: 1880

Design and construction
- Developer: Charles Edward Jeannerett

Website
- www.newportarms.com.au

The Newport Arms Hotel is a historic hotel located on the shores of Pittwater, New South Wales. The hotel was constructed in 1880 and is still a popular spot for tourists. It currently operates under the branding of The Newport, following its acquisition by hospitality group Merivale in 2015.

== History ==
Charles Edward Jeannerett, an entrepreneur from Sydney first established the hotel in 1880, as well as the adjacent Newport wharf. In 1881 Jeannerett hosted the visits by Prince Albert and Prince George (later to become King George V), taking them on a tour of the surrounding Pittwater and up the Hawkesbury River system. In the early 1890s day trippers would visit the hotel on the weekends, and drink bootleg alcohol that was produced by the McCarrs Creek moonshiners.

In 2015, The Newport Arms Hotel was purchased by Merivale and renamed The Newport. Merivale launched the first phase of a planned redevelopment in March 2016.

== See also ==
- List of pubs in Australia
- List of hotels in Australia
