= Sydney Amateur Sailing Club =

Sailing club in the Municipality of North Sydney, Sydney

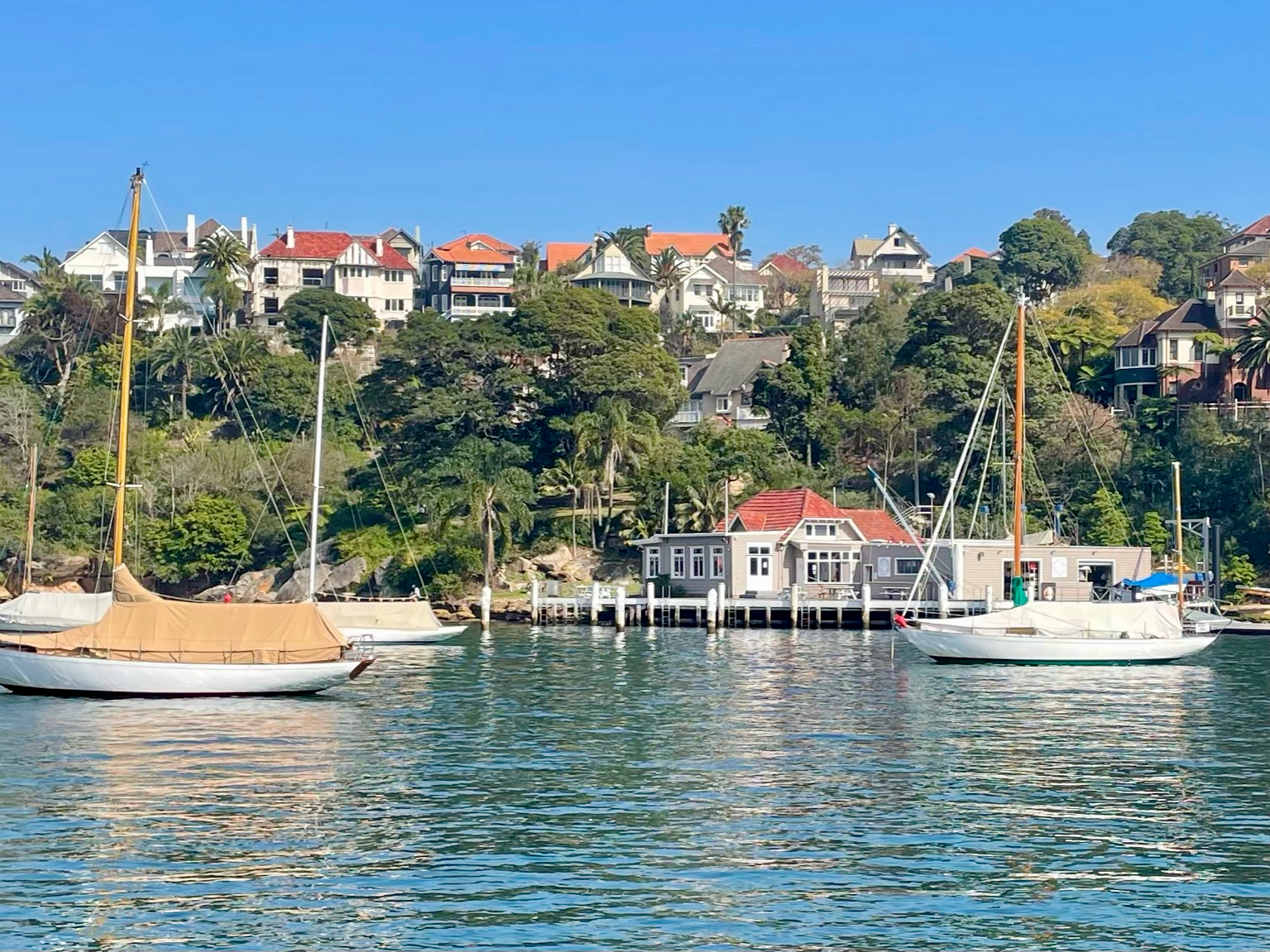
- The clubhouse in Mosman Bay, 2021
- Abbreviation: SASC
- Nickname: Amateurs
- Formation: 1 October 1872; 154 years ago
- Legal status: Active
- Headquarters: Cremorne Point
- Location: Cremorne, New South Wales, Australia
- Coordinates: 33°50′31″S 151°13′49″E
- Official language: English
- Commodore: Chris Manion
- Affiliations: Australian Sailing
- Website: Sydney Amateur Sailing Club

The Sydney Amateur Sailing Club (SASC) is one of the oldest sailing clubs in Australia and is located on Sydney's Lower North Shore, with its clubhouse on the western edge of Mosman Bay.

== Establishment ==
The Sydney Amateur Sailing Club was founded on 1 October 1872, starting with four boats and twelve members. It was formed in response by owners whose boats were too small (less than 22 ft (6.7 m)) to be admitted into the existing yacht clubs. The inaugural commodore was J. H. Amora, and the vice commodore was W. Backhouse. The first event held by the club was on 30 November 1872 in Sydney Harbour, with eight boats in the fleet. The initial meetings of the club were held at the Oxford Hotel. The first competitive races were held on the main harbour in early 1873.

== Clubhouse ==
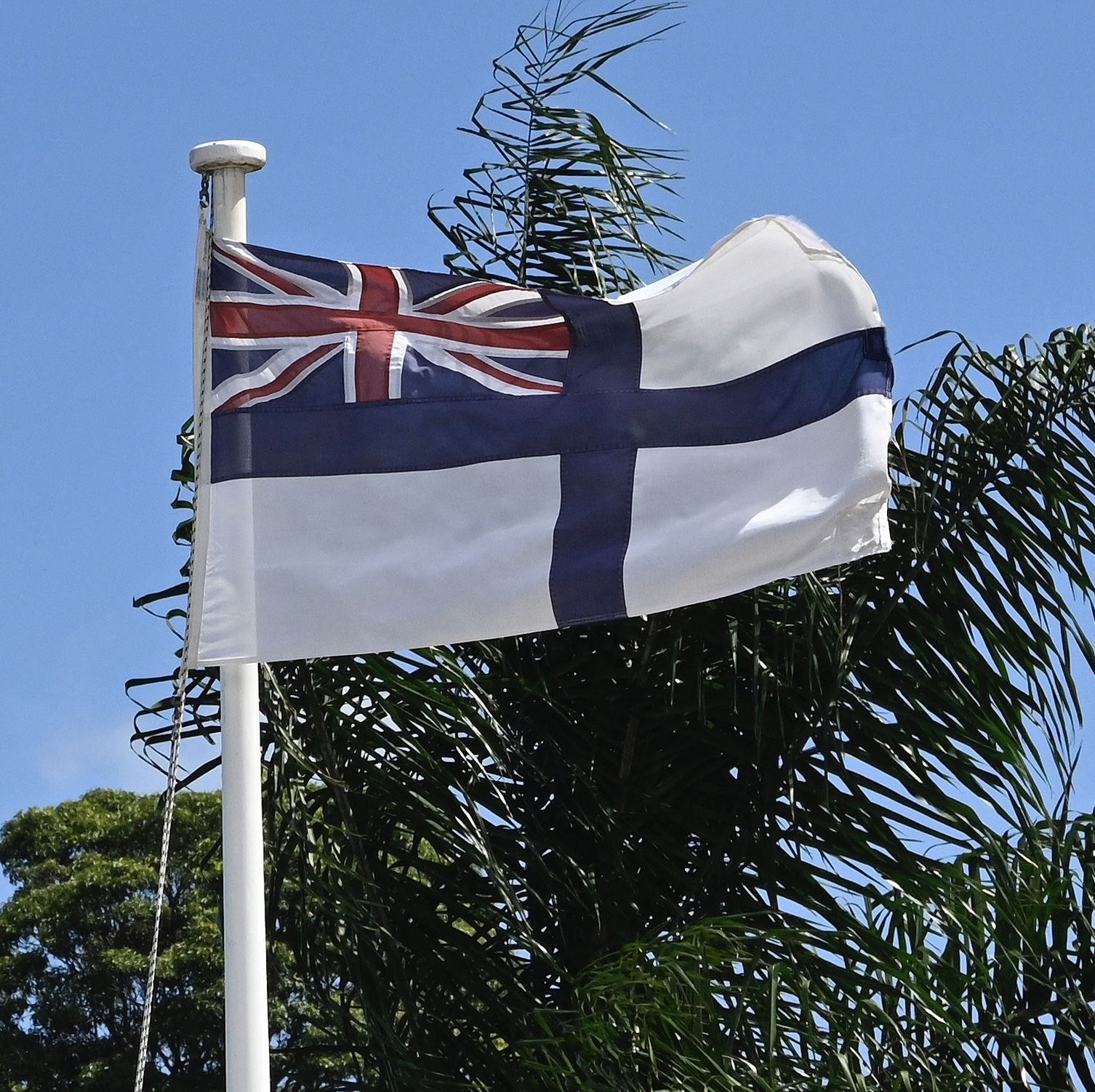
SASC Ensign Flag

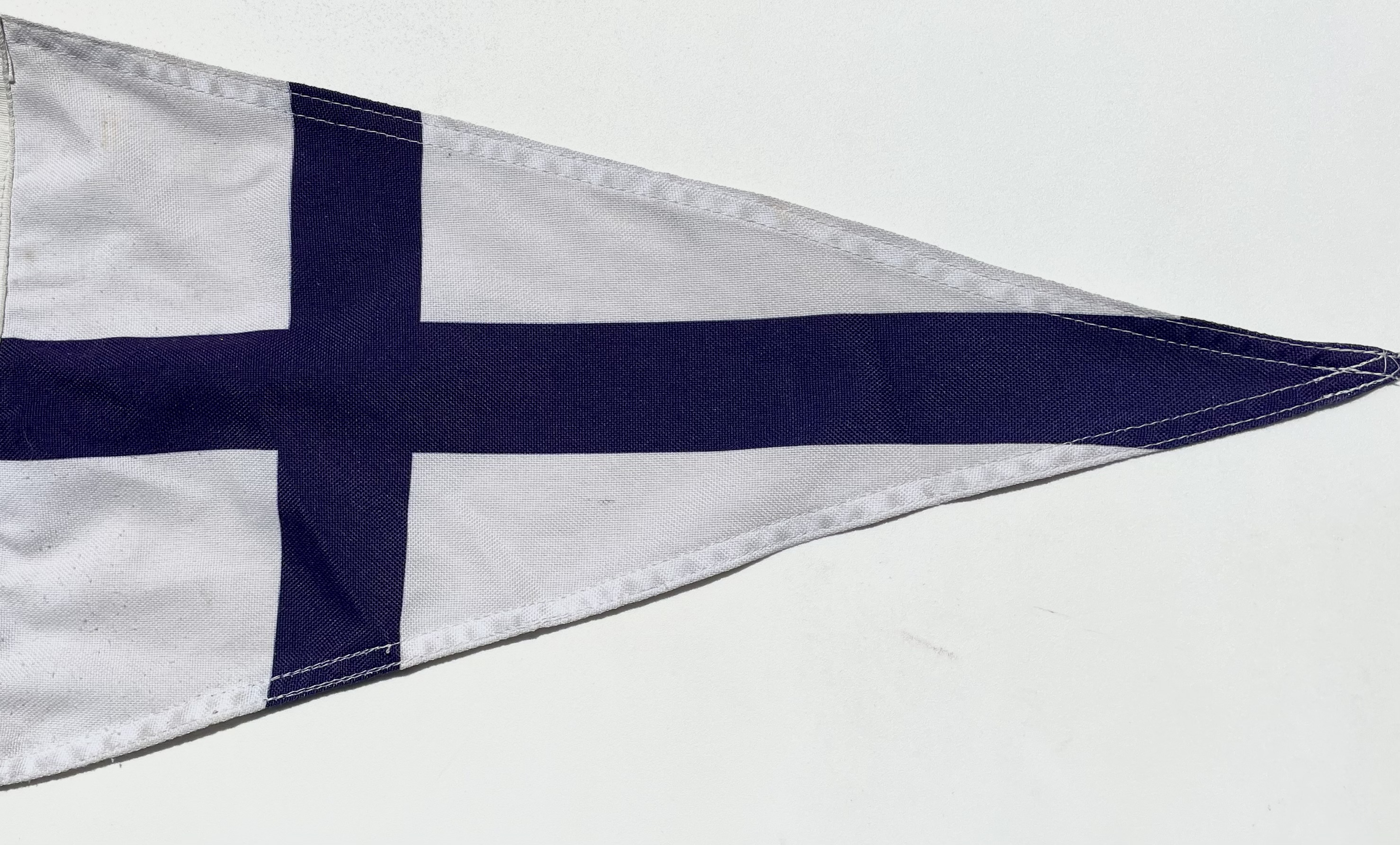
SASC Burgee

The original clubhouse was located at Bennelong Point, now the location of the Sydney Opera House. The club acquired the current clubhouse in August 1962, and this is situated at Cremorne Point. Upon European settlement in 1788, the area became known as Careening Point and HMS Sirius was refurbished in the bay in 1789. The clubhouse building features in the famous painting, The Harbour from Mosman, 1926, by Arthur Streeton.

Friday Twilight Race

== Famous yachts ==
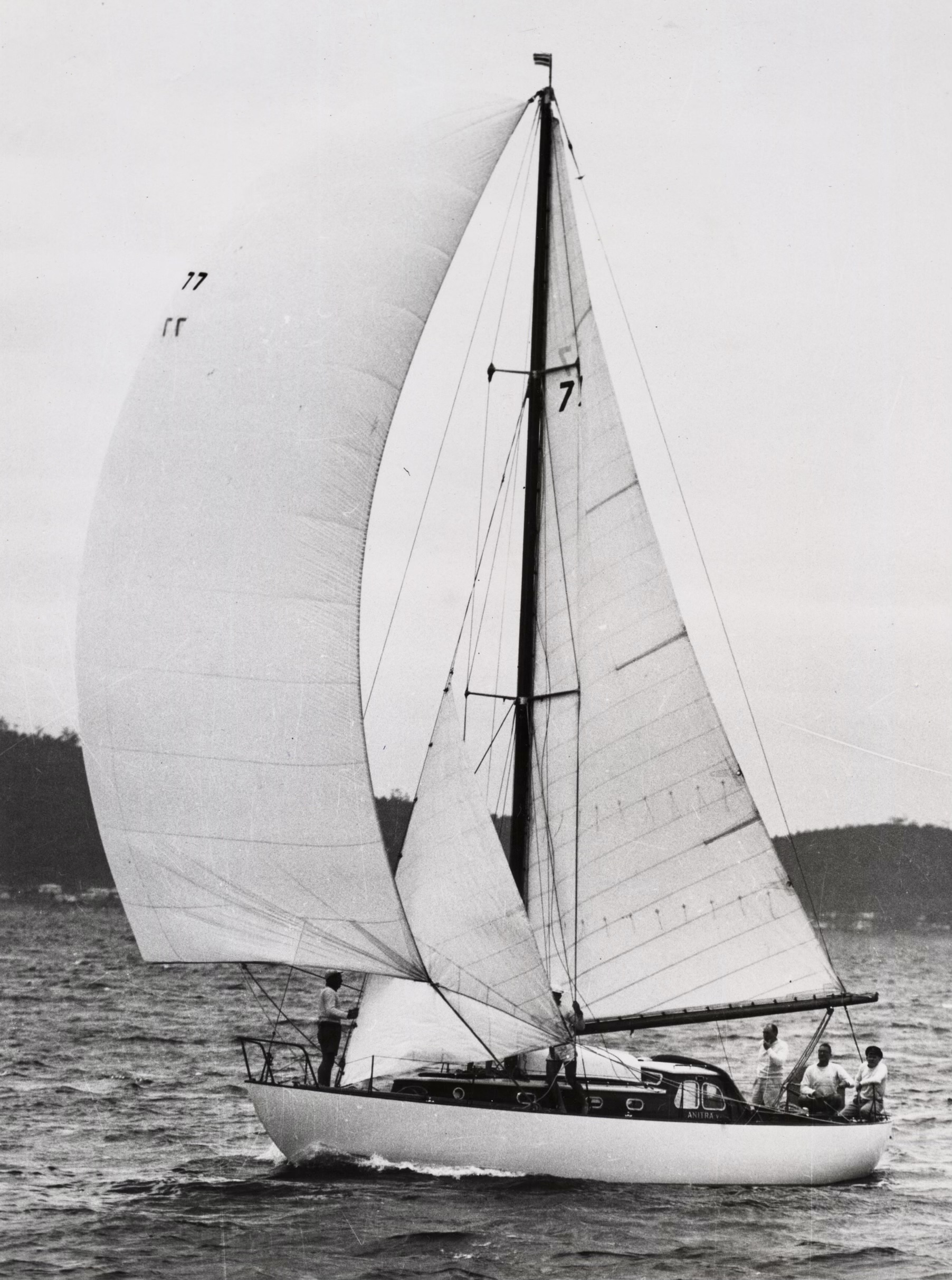
Anitra V winning the Sydney to Hobart Yacht Race in 1957

A number of club yachts have participated in the ocean classic, the Sydney to Hobart Yacht Race. Some of these are Maluka (built 1933), Lolita (built 1946), Anitra V (built 1956, handicap winner 1957), Malohi (built 1959), Fidelis (built 1964), and Mister Christian (built 1965). Keeping Australian maritime history alive, these classic yachts continue to race.

== Gaffers Day ==
Since 1972, the club has regularly hosted Gaffers Day for gaff rig sailing boats. Up to 90 yachts from around Australia sail on Sydney Harbour as a practical demonstration of the skills and technology used in the nautical past. Unique to Sydney, the club continues to foster wooden boats and traditional rigs that make them so distinctive.

== Women on Water ==
Gaffers Day October 2026

The club held its first Women on Water rally in 2020 to give women the opportunity, confidence and skills to sail. Since 1928, the club has encouraged women to take up sailing by holding regular events for boats to be sailed by women or by a crew member nominated by the owner. In 1928, the race was won by Miss Buckingham, who defeated 13 rivals by 45 seconds.

On 2 March 1964, a SASC race made the front page of the Sydney Morning Herald when sixteen yachts collided off Bradleys Head whilst rounding the last buoy of a nine mile race. The collision was the largest in Australian yachting history. Fortunately, there was no serious injury or damage, nor was a protest received.

== Trophies ==
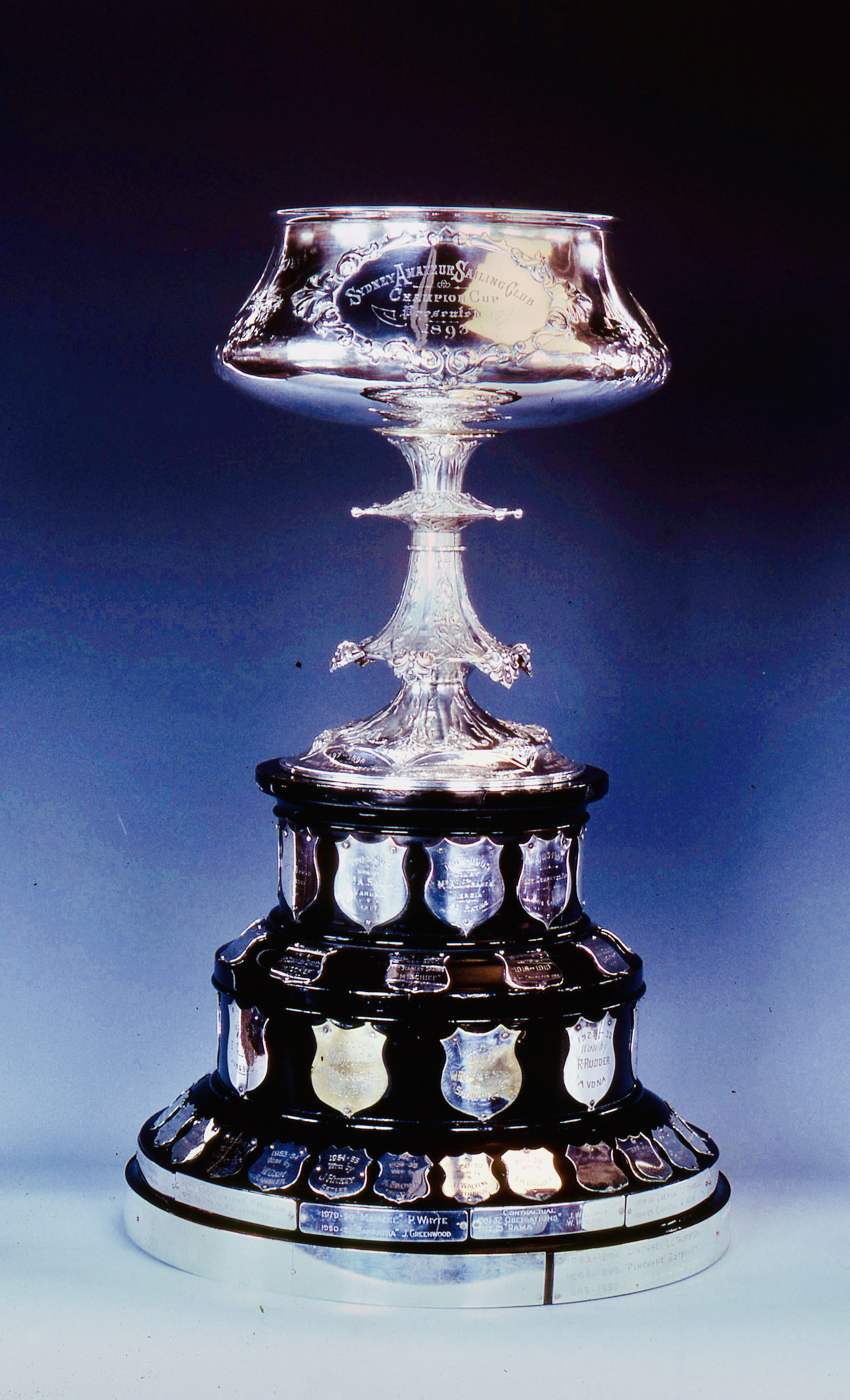
The Kelly Cup Trophy has been awarded since 1893

Each sailing season, the SASC has on offer over sixty trophies to be won. Perhaps one of the oldest continuous awarded trophies in Australian sailing is the Kelly Cup. A perpetual trophy for competition between the leading yachts from all divisions in the handicap point scores. It was donated by Commodore T.H. Kelly in 1893 as a Championship trophy.
