= Mosman Bay =

Bay in Sydney, New South Wales, Australia

Coordinates: 33°50′20″S 151°13′50″E

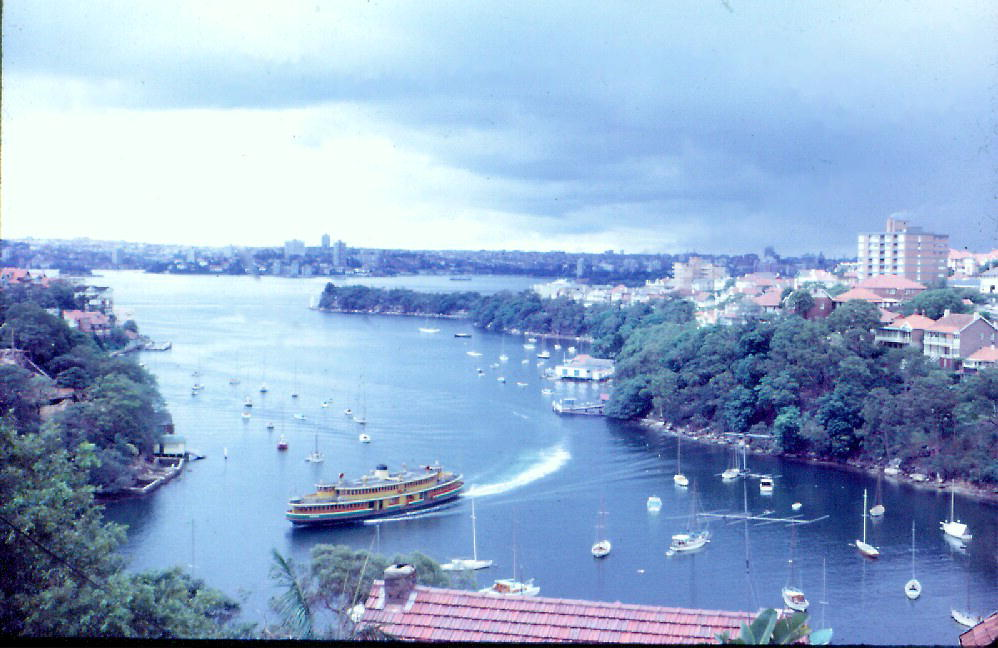
Mosman Bay and ferry Kanangra, with Cremorne Point on the right (1966)

Mosman Bay is a bay of Sydney Harbour adjacent to the suburb of Mosman, 4 km north-east of the Sydney CBD in New South Wales, Australia. Three ferry wharves are within the bay, all being served by the F6 Mosman Bay ferry service.

== History ==
Originally known as Great Sirius Cove, this name lives on in the next bay to the east, Sirius Cove (originally Little Sirius Cove).

The bay was originally so named after Governor Arthur Phillip's flagship and only defence of the colony, HMS Sirius, which was refitted in the Bay in 1789, the second year of the colony's existence.

In 1831, the bay's current namesake, Archibald Mosman, obtained a land grant for the area surrounding the bay. Together with his twin brother George, Mosman founded a whaling station within Mosman Bay. Substantial buildings and stone quaywork were erected. The quaywork remains (incorporated into later seawalls) as does the Old Barn, a sandstone building now used as a Scout hall.

Charles Rosman's boatshed was located in the bay adjacent Mosman Wharf. Rosman hire boats, moorings and slipping services. He also ran several small ferries. Rosman Ferries are now run out of Berry's Bay. Other waterside establishments include the Sydney Amateur Sailing Club, 3rd Mosman Bay Sea Scouts, and the Mosman Rowers.

Around 1880, resident Captain Blix built a timber pile footbridge across the Bat in the vicinity of "the Barn". This was a more substantial replacement for a number of basic crossings created to avoid the long walk around the mud flats in the upper reaches of the Bay. This structure was demolished around 1900 to facilitate the reclamation of the mud flats and the creation of Reid Park. A 1901-built structure had a moveable central span to allow dredges to pass. The deteriorating bridge was closed in 1967.

A sewage aqueduct over Reid Park at the head of Mosman Bay was in 1904 as part of the Neutral Bay and Mosman branch sewerage scheme. The arched steel structure also supports a pedestrian way linking Avenue Road and Park Avenue Mosman.

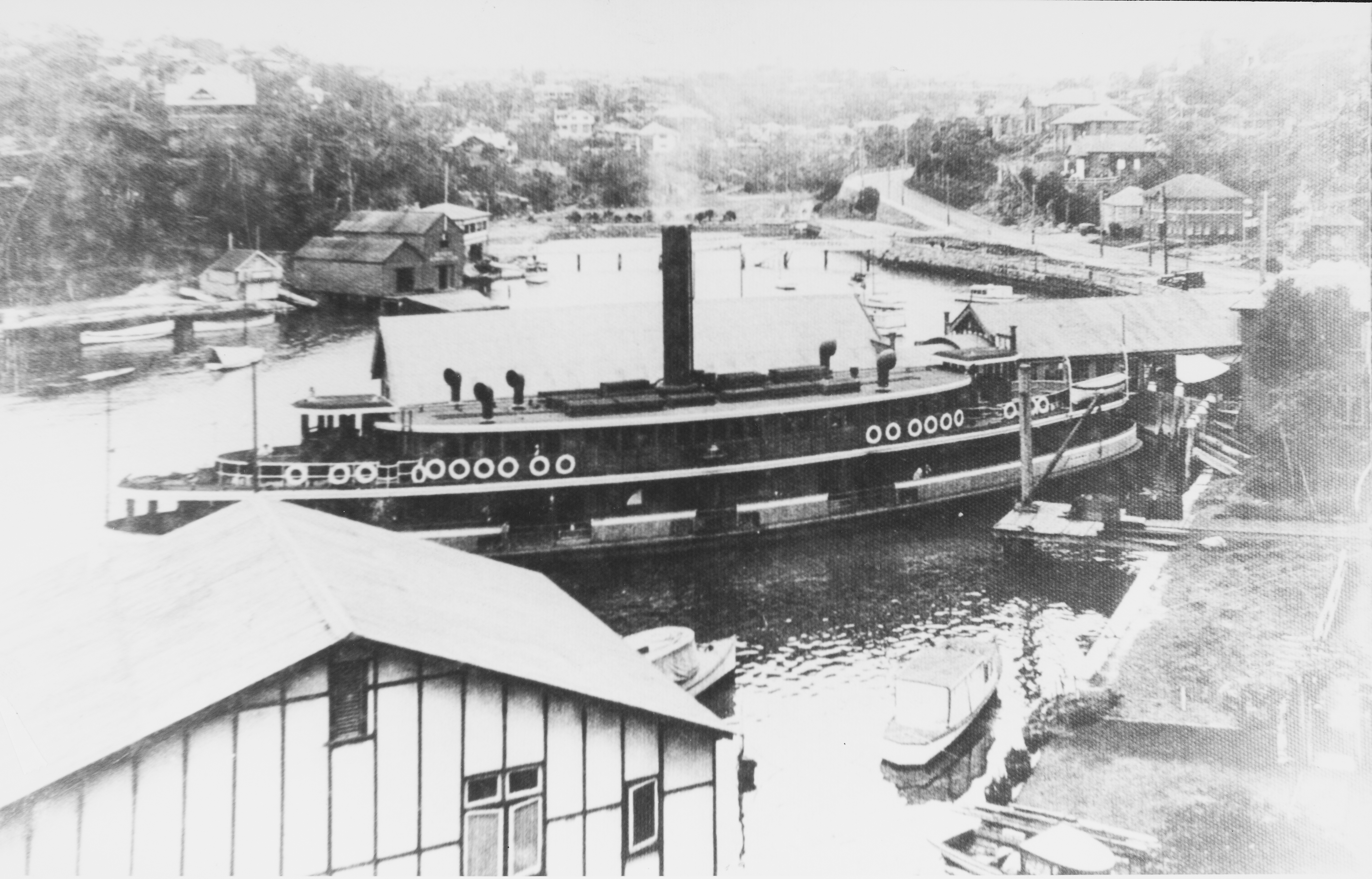
Kirawa at Mosman Wharf

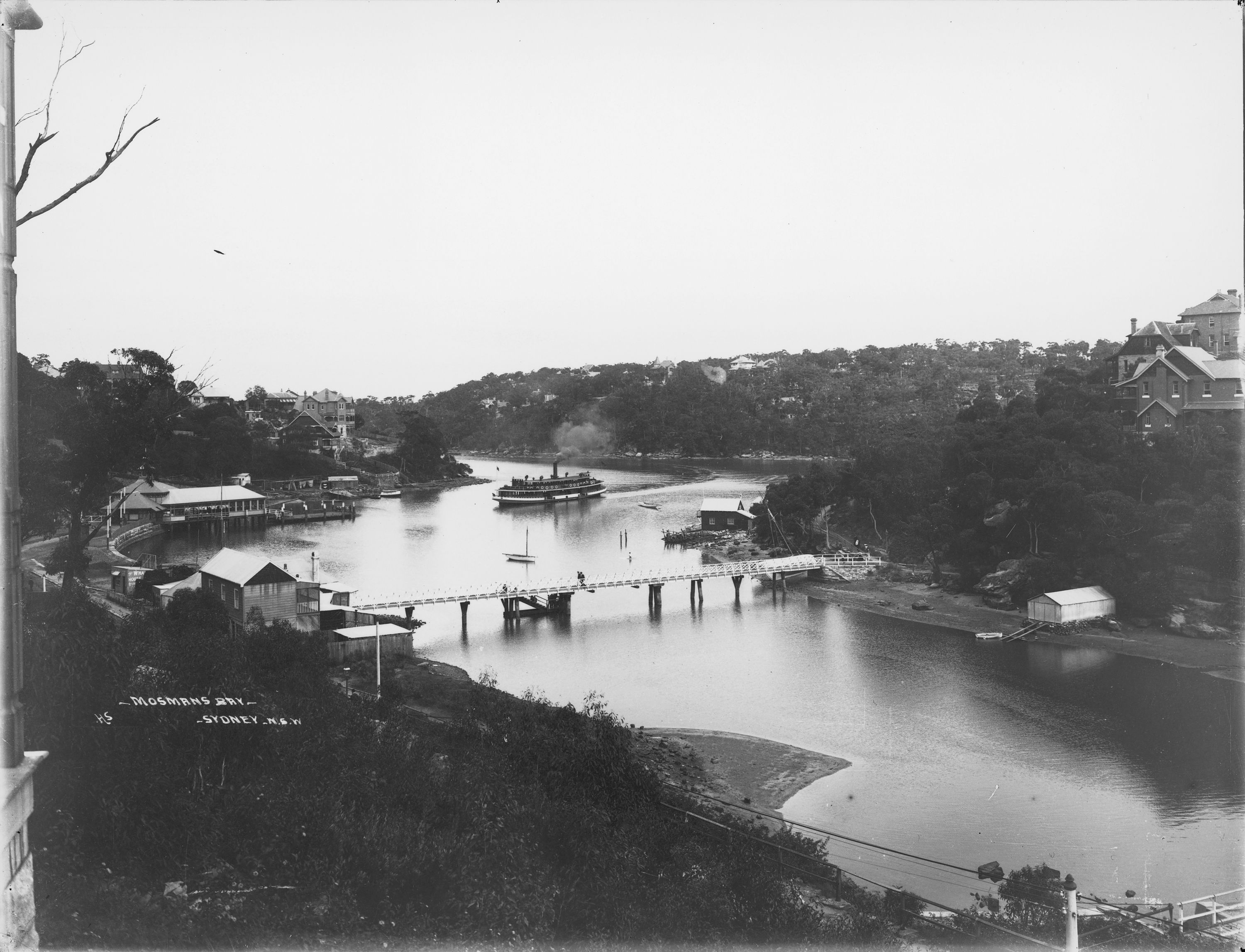
Mosman Bay circa 1905 showing Edwardian ferry wharf and footbridge which was removed in the 1960s

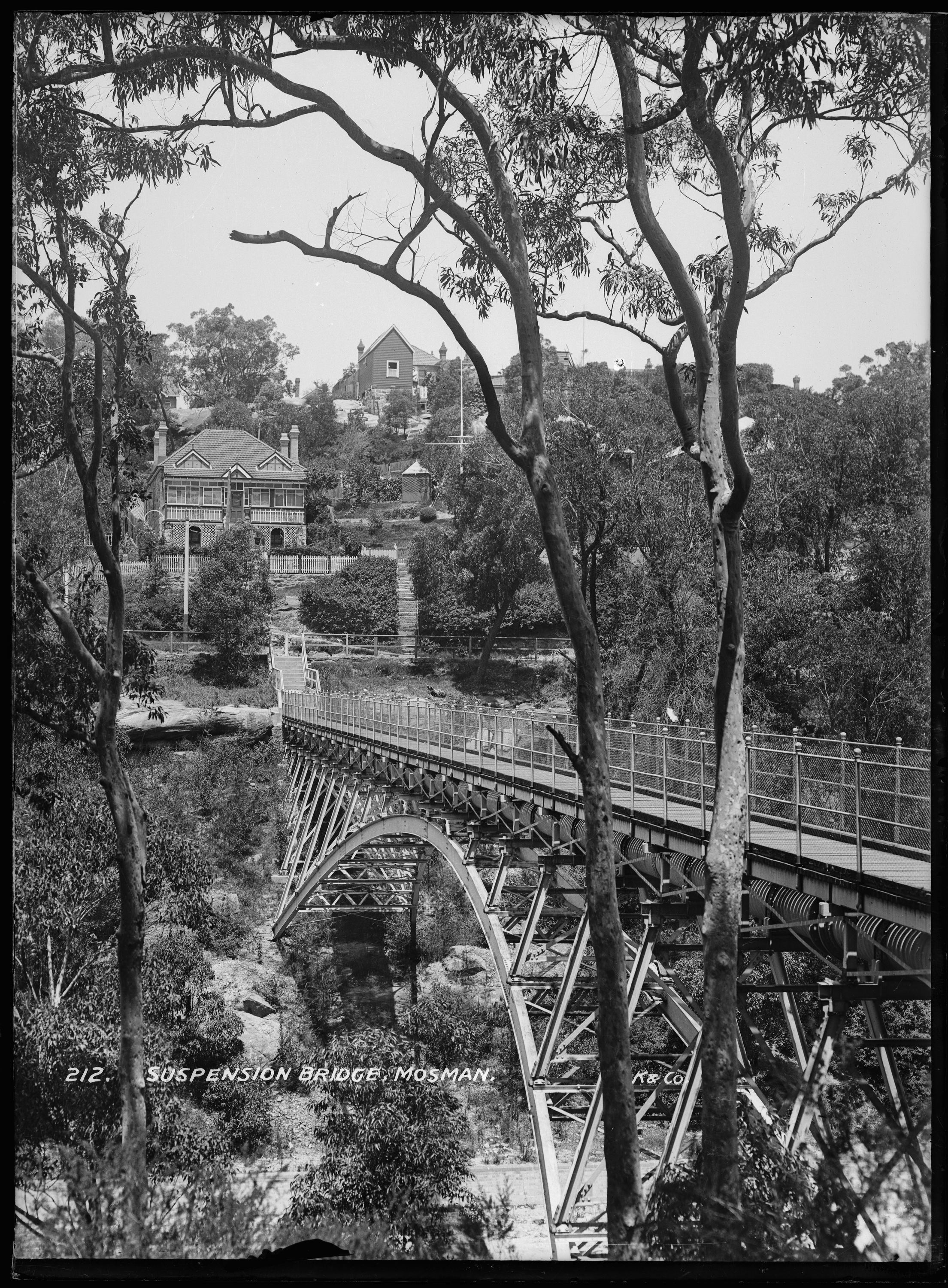
Heritage listed Sewer Aqueduct above Reid Park, early 20th century

== Transport ==
Keolis Northern Beaches operates 2 bus services around Mosman bay

Route 225 Cremorne Point wharf to Neutral Bay wharf

Route 230 Mosman Bay to Milsons Point

Transdev Sydney Ferries operate a ferry service the F6 Mosman Bay service with stops at

Name of Wharf	Opened	Accessible?	Photo of wharf
Cremorne Point		Yes	
South Mosman		Yes	
Old Cremorne		No	
Mosman Bay		Yes	
