= Hotel Grand Chancellor, Hobart =

Hotel building in Hobart, Tasmania

Hotel Grand Chancellor Hobart
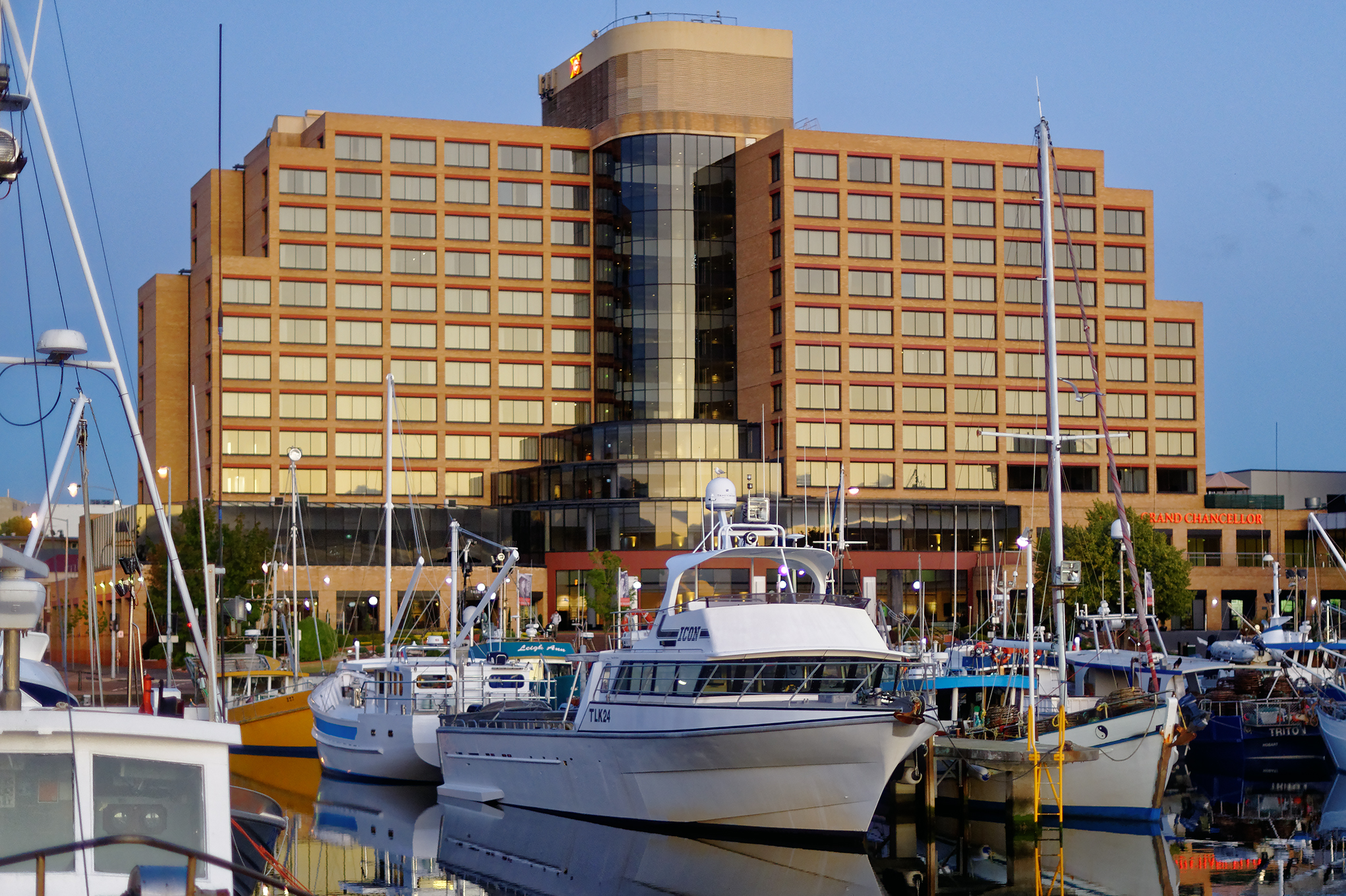
- Interactive map of the Hotel Grand Chancellor Hobart area

General information
- Location: 1 Davey Street, Hobart, Tasmania, Australia
- Coordinates: 42°52.84′S 147°20.02′E
- Opening: 1987, as Sheraton
- Owner: Grand Hotels International
- Management: Hotel Grand Chancellor

Technical details
- Floor count: 12
- Floor area: 5000m²

Design and construction
- Architects: Forward Brianese & Partners (1998)

Other information
- Number of rooms: 244
- Number of restaurants: 1 + 1 bar

Website
- Official site

The Hotel Grand Chancellor Hobart is a twelve-storey hotel located on the waterfront of Hobart, Tasmania, Australia.

== History ==
Originally part of a waterfront district called 'Wapping', the site where the Hotel Grand Chancellor is situated was historically a place of factory enterprise, industrial gas production, transport and shipping. Flanked by Macquarie, Davey, Campbell and Evans Street, the site originally consisted of two city blocks divided by Hunter Street, which extended to Macquarie Street; running directly through the location of the present-day hotel.

=== Early site history ===
The block encompassing Campbell and Hunter Streets were mostly used for shipping yard equipment and cargo, until becoming part of a service yard for the Hobart Electric Tram Company in 1893. The depot housed the city's trolleybuses from 1935 and from 1955 operated as the original headquarters for Metro Tasmania. The main section of the tram terminus was located directly opposite on Macquarie Street and its original offices, store and entrance arches all remain, with the latter being incorporated into newly built structures. On the corner of Hunter and Macquarie stood seed and fertilizer wholesalers Clement & Marshalls. Several smaller factory buildings operated by the Van Diemen's Land Company and merchants A. G. Webster & Son faced Davey Street.

The northern block, comprising Hunter and Evans Streets, primarily contained the Hobart Gas Company precinct, including its landmark gas holder situated on Davey Street, which at the time did not intersect with the Brooker Highway (formally Lower Park Street). The Hobart Gas Company was founded in 1854 to produce illuminating gas for the city's buildings and streetlights. At the time of its construction, it was the third largest gasworks in the southern hemisphere, after Sydney (1841) and Melbourne (1850). Some original gasworks buildings that were part of the original complex survive on the opposite side of Evans Street. Facing Hunter Street, the northern block featured sandstone buildings dating back to the 1800s; the Phoenix Hotel (later the Tasma Coffee Palace), Steam Packet Tavern and the Tasmanian Woolen Factory, which greatly expanded its frontage along Macquarie Street in 1921, engulfing several surrounding buildings. All the buildings were demolished in 1938 for the Nettlefolds General Motors dealership, a large Art Deco commercial building containing a corner tower and neon signage. The site housed a General Motors showroom, bodyworks and service centre specialising in Vauxhall and Bedford trucks.

=== Hotel construction ===
In 1985, the Metro Tasmania transport depot and Nettlefolds building were demolished for the construction of a new Sheraton hotel. Part of the Sheraton masterplan saw Hunter Street being cut off from Macquarie Street and Davey Street connect with the newly created Brooker Highway to create a large city block. During construction, the hotel design was altered in response to government criticism, seeing the developers forced to remove thousands of pink bricks that were supposed to be a sandstone colour in order to blend with surrounding heritage buildings. The hotel opened in 1987 as the Sheraton Hobart Hotel and was taken over by the Grand Hotels International group in 1993.

== Facilities ==
The hotel has an indoor heated pool, a gym and a sauna on site for guest usage.

== Federation Concert Hall ==
The Federation Concert Hall provides an international standard venue for the Tasmanian Symphony Orchestra (TSO) as well as extensive conference and convention facilities for the Grand Chancellor.

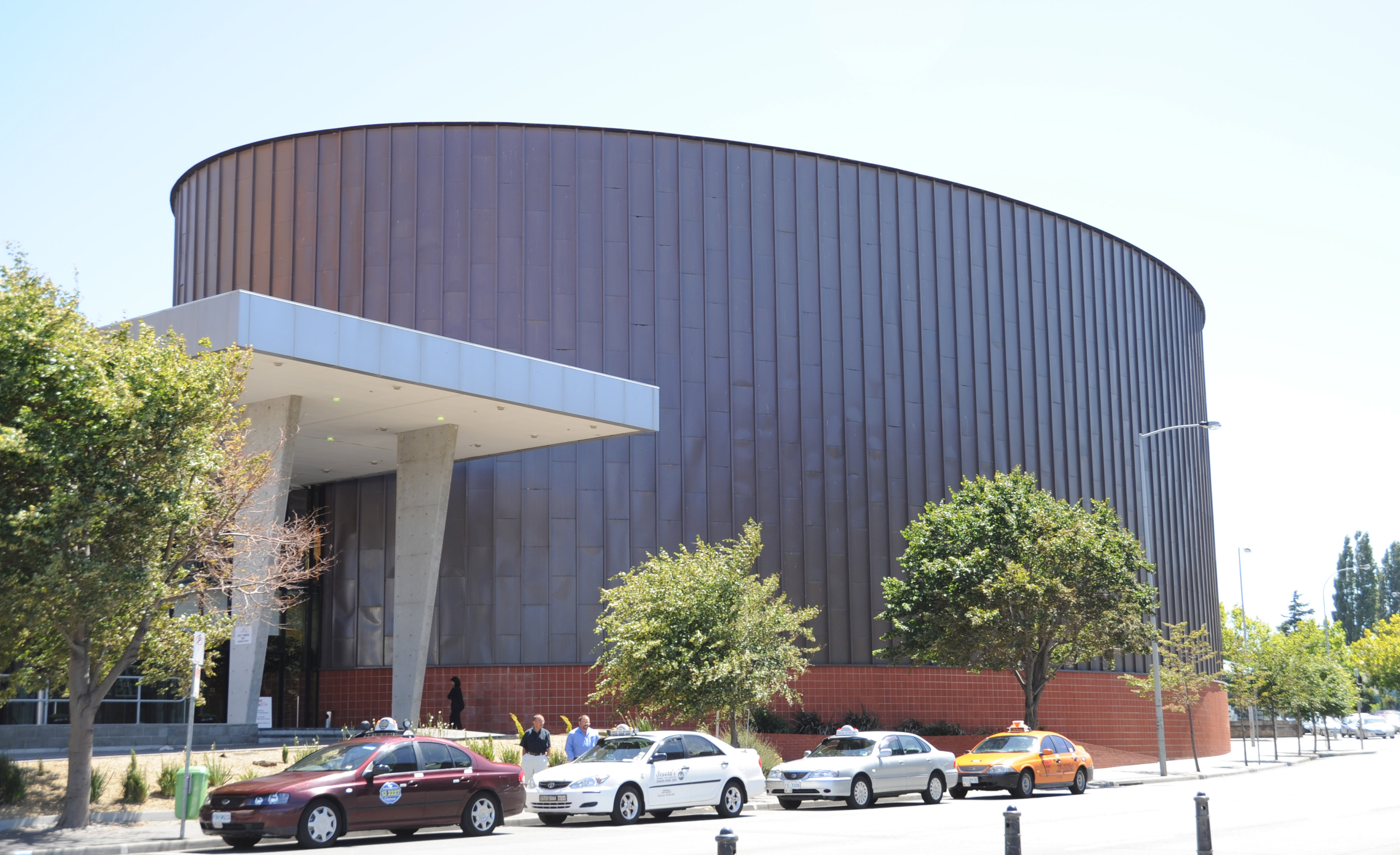
Federation Concert Hall

In 1998, the Grand Chancellor underwent a sizeable expansion on the eastern side of the hotel for the creation of a new entertainment complex encompassing a world-class concert hall, ballroom and conference room facilities. Instigated by the desire of the TSO to relocate from the ageing facilities at the ABC Odeon Theatre to a modern auditorium, the Federal Government contributed $1m funding from the Federation Fund, an especially established construction incentive to celebrate the centenary of the Federation of Australia. The building's namesakes of Federation Concert Hall and Federation Ballroom are due to the venue benefiting from the scheme.

Designed by architects Forward Brianese & Partners, its brass cladding and cylinder appearance was inspired by the historic gas holder tank, built by the Hobart Gas Company in 1854. Built at a cost of $13m, the adjoining venue was opened in 2000, consisting of an 1,100 seat capacity concert hall and a 1,000 seat capacity ballroom. Digital production-mixing equipment was installed in the venue in 2002.

The Federation Concert Hall is currently Hobart's third largest indoor venue, after the Tasman Room at Wrest Point and Derwent Entertainment Centre.

== In popular culture ==
Dressed as a Parisian airport hotel, the foyer area was utilised as a location for the 2011 film The Hunter starring Willem Dafoe.

== Tenants ==
The Grand Chancellor is home to the Restaurant Tasman, the Atrium Bar, Hobart Art Gallery and Zenica Hairdressing.

== See also ==
- List of tallest buildings in Hobart
- Hotel Grand Chancellor, Launceston
