= Hotel Grand Chancellor, Launceston =

Hotel in Launceston, Tasmania, Australia

Coordinates: 41°26′4.6″S 147°8′26.2″E

Hotel Grand Chancellor
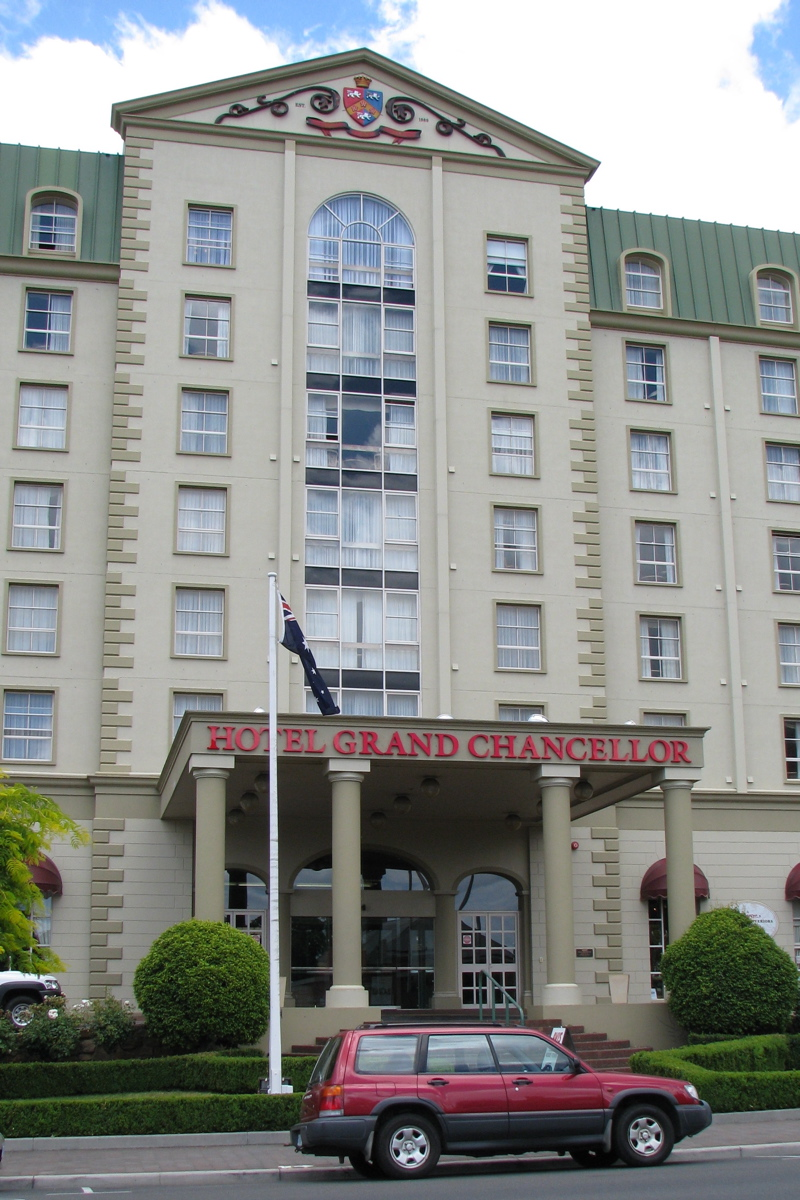
- Interactive map of the Hotel Grand Chancellor area

General information
- Location: Launceston, Tasmania, Australia
- Opening: 1989
- Owner: Grand Hotels International
- Management: Hotel Grand Chancellor

Technical details
- Floor count: 7

Design and construction
- Architect: Robert Hosken

Other information
- Number of restaurants: 1 + 1 bar

Website
- Official Site

The Hotel Grand Chancellor in Launceston, Tasmania, Australia formerly known as the Novotel, is a seven-storey building located in the city's central business district (CBD). Completed in August 1989, the building was constructed at a cost of $44 million, with up to 130 men working on-site. Before the official opening of the hotel, 20,000 locals visited the Chancellor on its open day. Before the late 20th century development, Launceston's hotels and structures were predominantly constructed in the nineteenth century. Robert Hosken proposed the new international hotel in the early 1980s, which he described to be "the biggest commercial development in Launceston's history." He described the facade as "classic Georgian design in the grand European style, with rustic brickwork and rendering." However, many residents thought the architecture was foreign to the rest of the city and sought a more modern and innovative design.

== See also ==
- Hotel Grand Chancellor, Hobart
