= Cremorne Point =

- Suburb
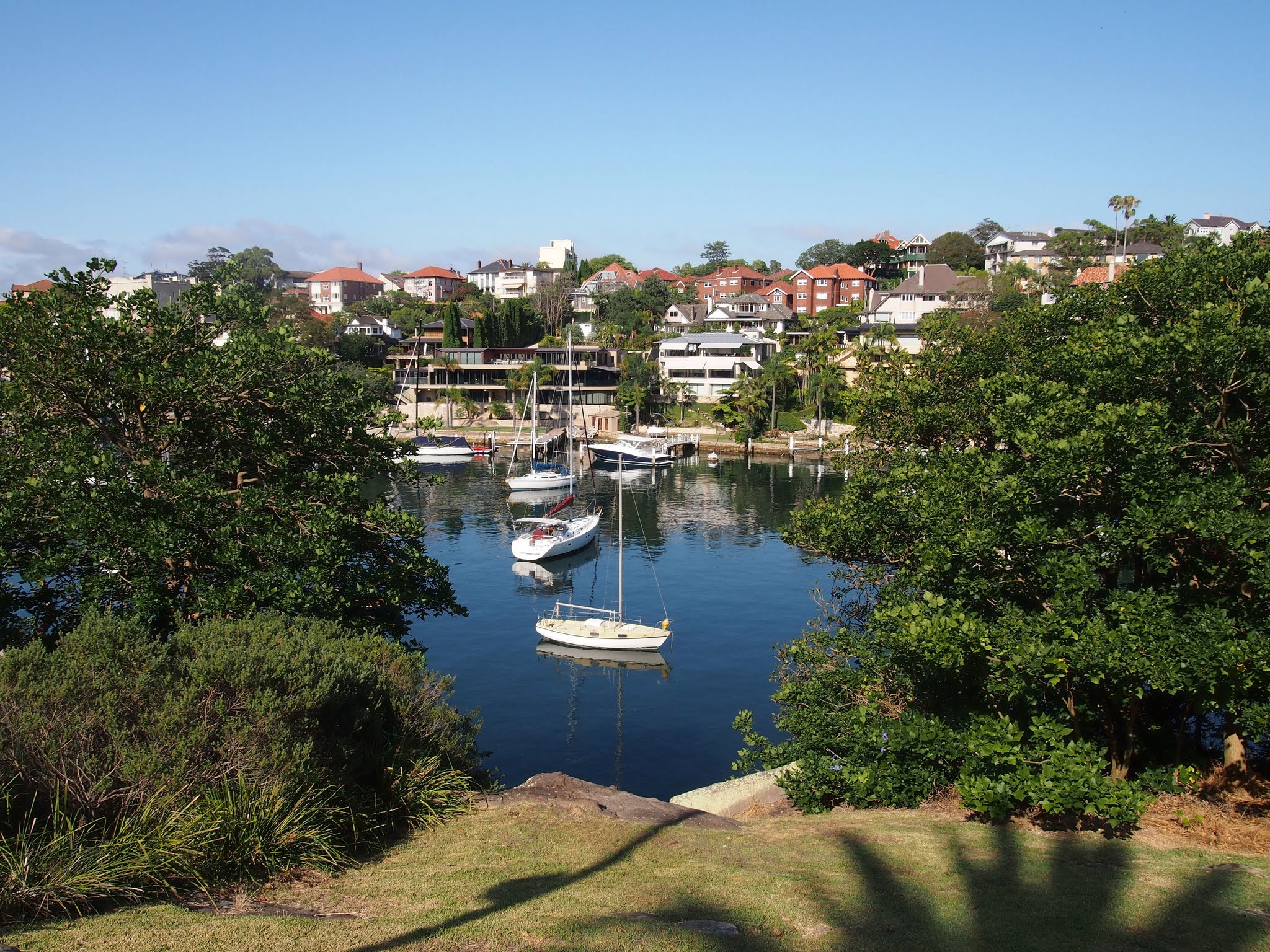
- Cremorne Point viewed from across Mosman Bay

- Interactive map of Cremorne Point
- Country: Australia
- State: New South Wales
- City: Sydney
- LGA: North Sydney Council
- Location: 6 km (3.7 mi) north of Sydney central business district

Government
  - State electorate: North Shore
  - Federal division: Warringah

Population
  - Total: 2,270 (2021 census)
- Postcode: 2090
Suburbs around Cremorne Point
Neutral Bay	Cremorne	Mosman
Neutral Bay	Cremorne Point	Mosman
		Mosman

Cremorne Point is a harbourside suburb on the Lower North Shore of Sydney, New South Wales, Australia located six kilometres north of the Sydney central business district, in the local government area of North Sydney Council.

Cremorne Point shares the postcode of 2090 with Cremorne, a separate suburb to the north. Cremorne Point sits on Sydney Harbour between Shell Cove and Mosman Bay.

== Etymology ==
Cremorne Point was named after the Cremorne Gardens in London, a popular pleasure ground in England, which derives from Gaelic words meaning 'boundary' and 'chieftain'. Robertsons Point was named after James Robertson who was granted 35 hectares there in 1820. He was the father of Premier Sir John Robertson.

== History ==
Wooloorigang / Cremorne Point and Mosman Bay were both once Cammeraygal territory named Wul-warra-Jeung before European settlement in Sydney Cove to their south. Aborigines called the waters east of the point Goram-Bullagong. In early European settlement after 1788, it became known as Careening Point and Mosman Cove became known as Hungry Bay. Careening Point commemorates HMS Sirius, a ship from the First Fleet of 1788, which was refurbished, pushed upstream in Mosman Bay.

=== Nineteenth century ===
In January 1822 Scot James Robertson, a watch maker, arrived on the Providence with wife and six children to become Supervisor of Governor Brisbane's astronomical instruments and clocks at his observatory in the Parramatta Domain. Brisbane was named "founder" of Australian science by Sir William Herschel, himself a noted astronomer and botanist who spent some time in South Africa. Robertson was granted a large amount of land on the Upper Hunter River and later in 1823 a further 35 hectares (86 acres) of Cremorne headland, where he built a Georgian house with fine cedar joinery. In its grounds were some fine pear trees. One of his sons became Sir John Robertson, NSW's fifth Premier – and premier five times.

James Milson Jnr (1814–1903), son of James Milson who had owned much land in nearby Milsons Point, was a merchant and a pastoralist in NSW and Queensland. He expanded the family's land holdings in the lower North Shore, including the 1853 purchase of the Cremorne peninsula. The sale of this land for residential blocks in the last years of the 19th and early years of the 20th centuries proved to be especially profitable. Much to Milson's disgust, the courts prevented him from selling building blocks running right to the water's edge and Cremorne is consequently one of the few Sydney Harbour peninsulas with a public, waterfront park running around its edges. The last of the family's holdings in the lower North Shore area were resumed in the early 1920s for the construction of the Harbour Bridge and associated roadways.

The Rev. W. B. Clarke identified a coal seam running under much of Sydney and proposed it be mined. An experimental copper smelting industry was established in the mid-1840s on the eastern shore but was not successful and was removed by 1849.

In 1853 North Shore pioneer James Milson bought the land – Robertson's house became the Cremorne Hotel, later Cremorne House – and three years later leased 9 hectares (22 acres) to J. R. Clarke and Charles H. Woolcott, who planned Cremorne Gardens, named for the rather notorious Regency Pleasure Gardens in London. These opened in 1856 with 12 hectares (30 acres) and amusements galore. Steamers plied from Circular Quay and Woolloomooloo Bay every half hour until late. There were scenic walks – the Serpentine Walk and Italian Walk. Papers advertised "a monster dancing stage, 508 centimetres (200 in) in circumference', an "excellent (German) band, carousel, archery, quoits, rifle shooting, skittles, gymnastics, rifle gallery and refreshments" at Sydney prices. Even a masked ball. At 8pm, magnificent fireworks, a la Vauxhall Pleasure Gardens (London) and splendid pyrotechny as in Cremorne Gardens, London. The Sydney Morning Herald declared Cremorne to "be ranked among the best of those places of holiday resort of a superior order which have recently sprung into existence in the neighbourhood of Sydney". Anyone missing the last boat was compelled to remain behind overnight, as the bush was too thick to penetrate and few cared to swim back. By 1862 the place had an unsavoury reputation and the "Gardens" were in ruins.

Around 1875 a white cask was moored just off Cremorne Point and used for target practice from Mrs Macquarie's Chair. Balls from the 31-kilogram (68 lb) cannon would skim across the harbour ending up near Whiting Beach, near Taronga Zoo. The barrage would stop for the hourly steam ferry. In the 1880s and 1890s Cremorne Point was a more genteel Victorian Sunday destination.

In 1891 and 1893 Sydney Harbour Collieries sank exploratory bores and discovered coal ten feet thick. Despite support from the Mines Department, the Lands Department refused permission to build coal wharves and the company found an alternative base in Balmain.

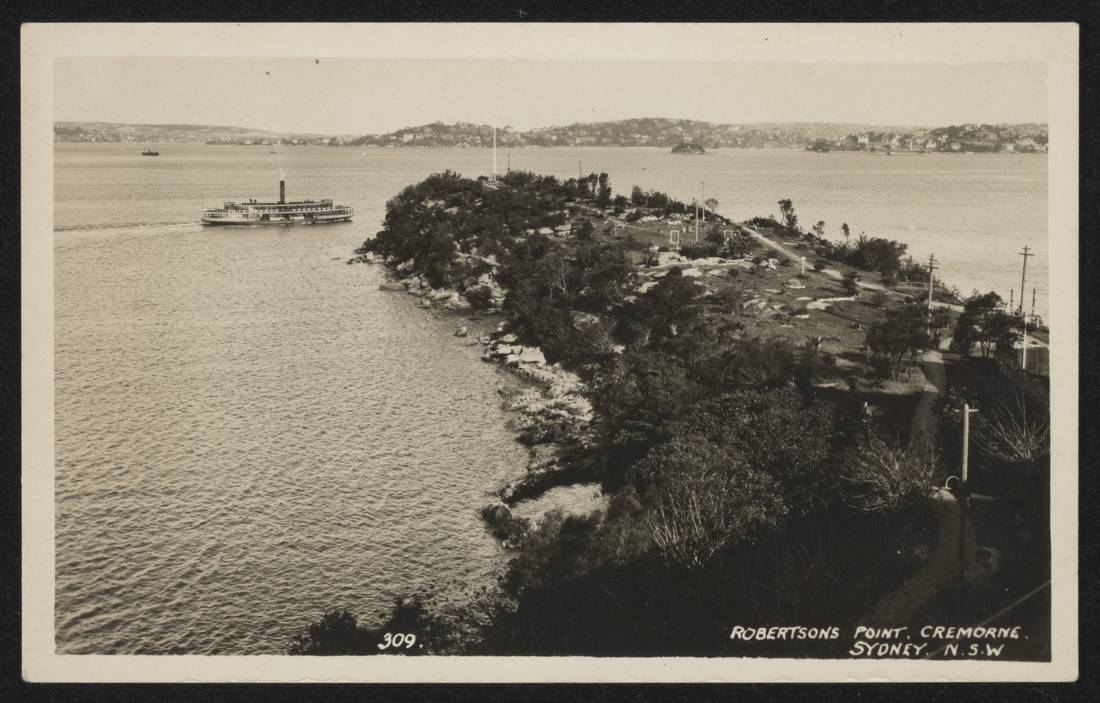
Cremorne Point in the early 1900s

=== Twentieth century ===
In 1905 a Harbour Foreshores Vigilance Committee formed and Cremorne Reserve was proclaimed later that year, with North Sydney Council as trustee. This was the culmination of a ten-year campaign to secure the area as public land. It reflected other campaigns for harbour foreshore reserves and conservation of that time. Magnificent harbour and city views were and remain available from here.

The McCallum Pool west of Cremorne Point was built in the 1920s as a pool for residents. As the threat of industrialisation subsided, others arose. Subdivision of the peninsula followed land reservation. By 1925 residential development encroached. While private gardens flourished, weeds and rubbish choked the foreshore reserve. Reports that "respectable people" didn't go there at night suggest it was sheltering the homeless or carousing couples after dark. North Sydney Council started a beautification campaign in the 1920s with local residents helping, transforming it by the 1930s. Several elements of that era survive – a concrete and chicken wire sign, archway etc. Then, perhaps due to the 1930s depression and World War II, it sank into neglect again.

The area attracted various architects including J. Burcham Clamp: his house The Laurels (1907, extended 1920) is a striking Arts & Crafts example. A 1927 issue of The Home magazine featured an Italian (Mediterranean revival) example – a house belonging to Mr F. C. Lane.

Cremorne Point is particularly well-known for the quality of its Arts and Crafts residential architecture.

=== Transport ===
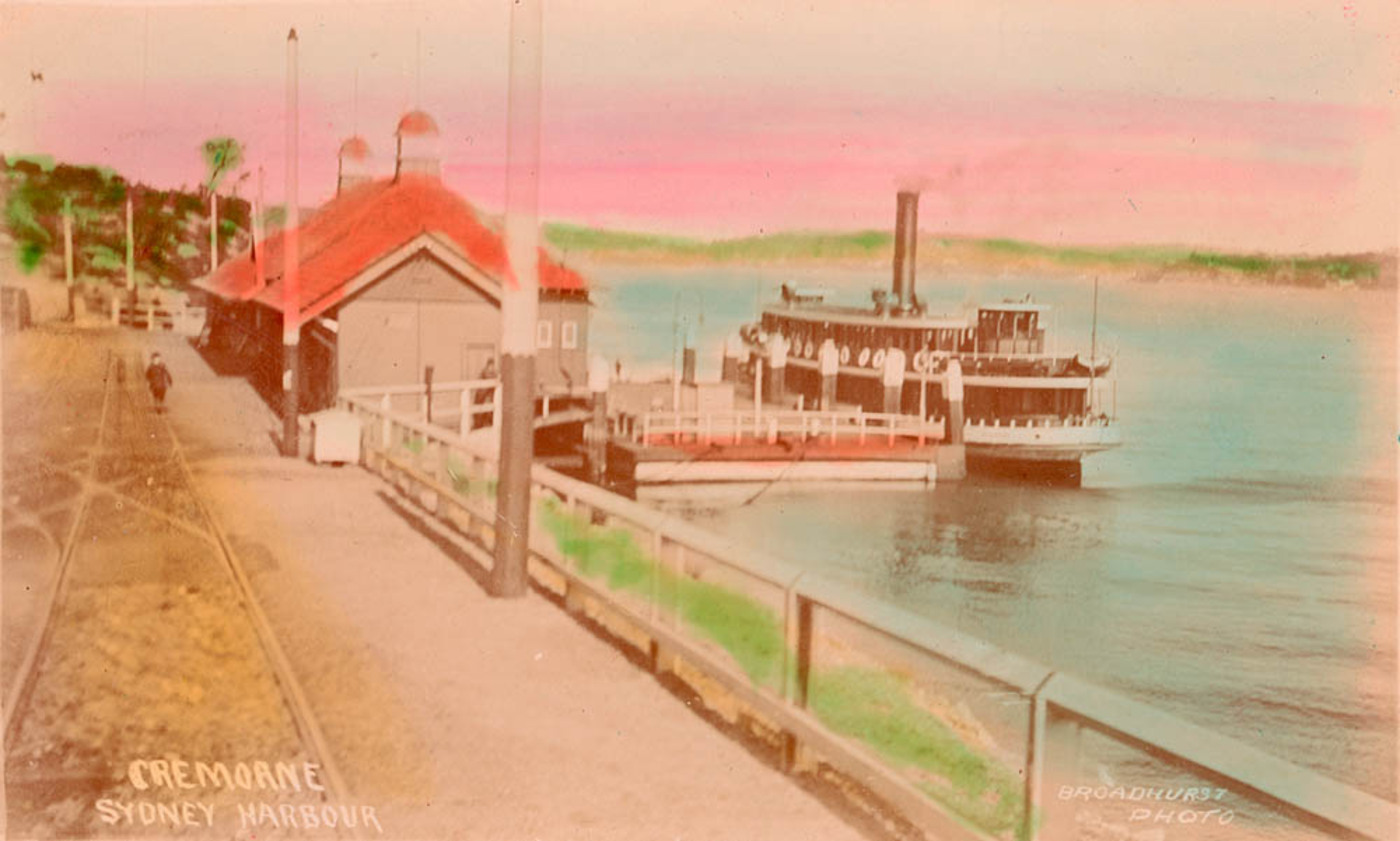
Cremorne Point wharf, early twentieth century showing tram line and K-class ferry

Initially, access across the harbour was largely by being rowed by a privately hired watermen. Cremorne Point was included as a stop by privately operated ferry services to Mosman in the 1850s, however, these were discontinued due to lack of local residents. Old Cremorne Wharf on the east side of the point was included in regular services to Mosman and Neutral Bay that recommenced in 1872. Sydney Ferries Limited built a new wharf at Robertson Point in 1911 and added ferry services from Circular Quay on 18 December 1911 to meet a new tram service that also commenced that year. The Edwardian style wharf building burnt down in 1975. The pontoon partially sunk in storms on 9 June 2007 and was operational again on 15 September 2007.

The foreshore path from Neutral Bay to Cremorne Point wharf dates to 1830 when the reserve was retained by the Crown. Cremorne Point Reserve is the most substantial example in North Sydney of imposition of the 30-metre (100 ft) (Harbour Foreshore) Reservation, applied from 1828.

== Demographics ==
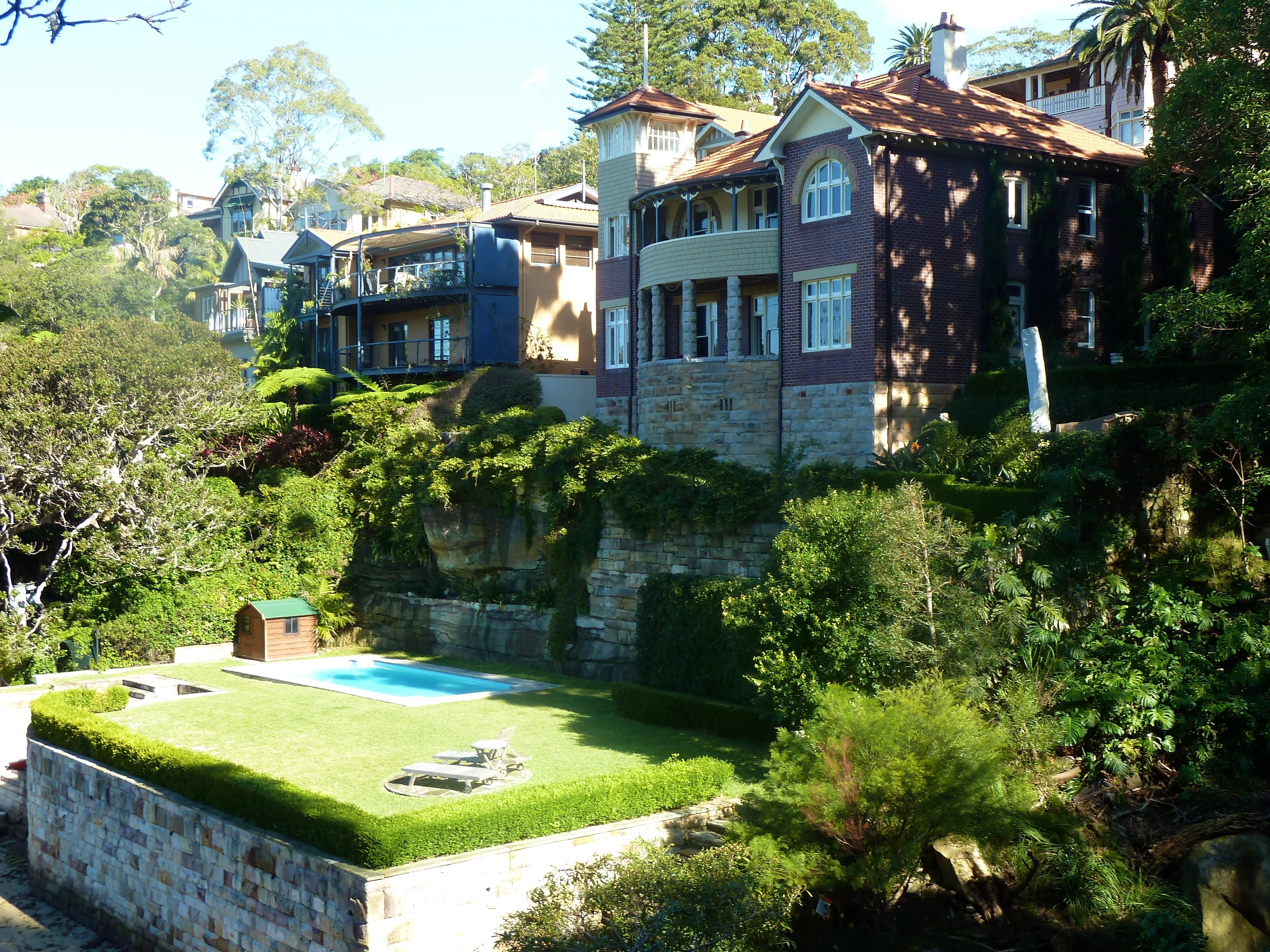
Houses in Cremorne Point

According to the 2021 census, there were 2,270 residents in Cremorne Point.

- 61.5% of people were born in Australia. The next most common country of birth was England at 8.1%. 83.1% of people spoke only English at home.
- The residents were somewhat older than the norm for Australia; their median age was 47 years, compared to the national median of 38 years. Children aged under 15 years made up 12.6% of the population (national average is 18.2%) and people aged 65 years and over made up 23.0% of the population (national average is 17.3%).
- The median household weekly income in Cremorne Point was $2,951, a little less than double the national median of $1,746.
- The great majority (79.9%) of the occupied private dwellings in Cremorne Point were flats, units or apartments. This is significantly higher than the national average of 14.2% for these dwelling types.
- The most common responses for religion were No Religion 45.3%, Catholic 20.3% and Anglican 16.5%.

== Transport ==
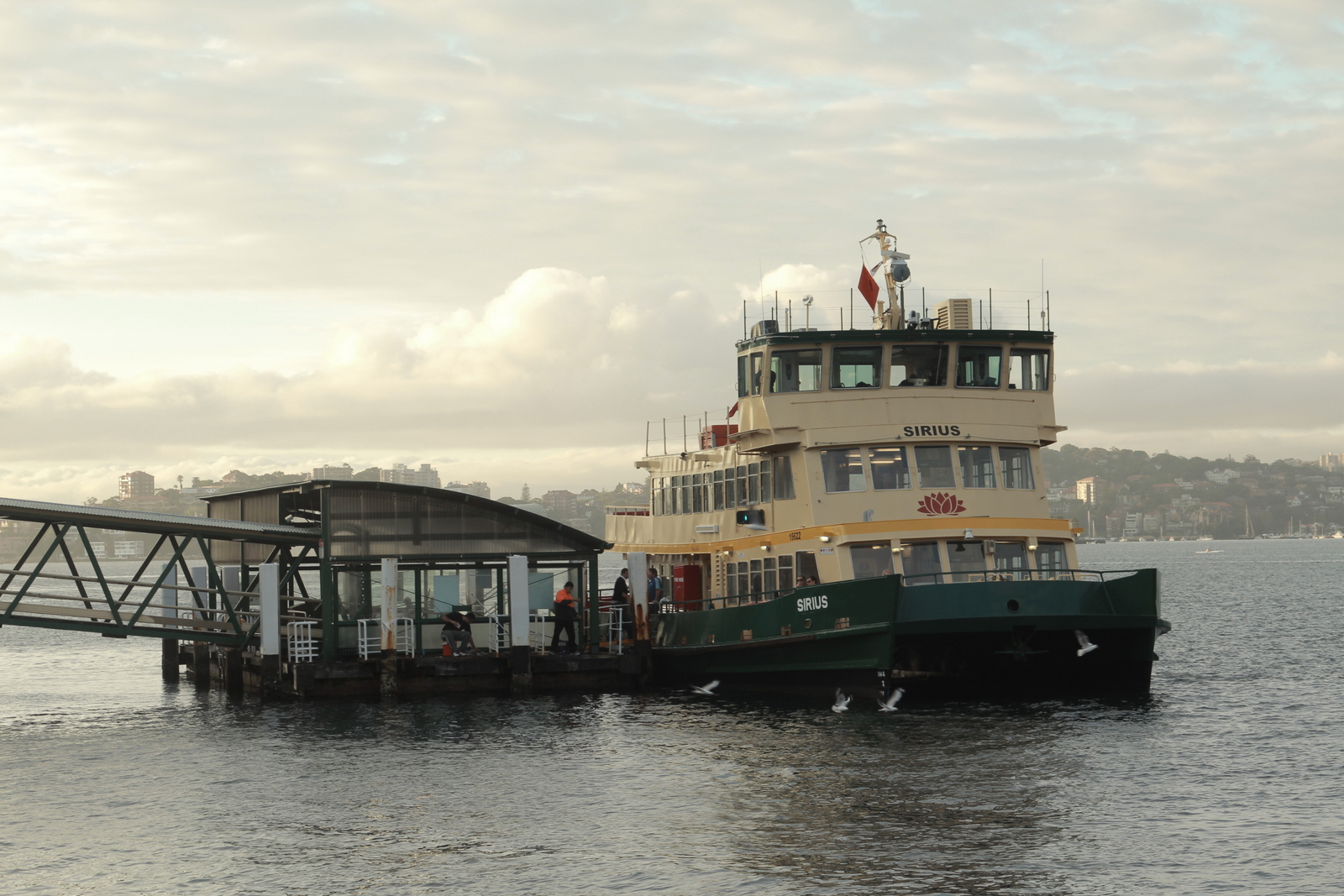
Cremorne Point ferry wharf

Cremorne Point has two ferry wharves, both of which are part of the Mosman Bay route. Cremorne Point ferry wharf is located on the peninsula's south-west, and Old Cremorne wharf is located in Mosman Bay on the east of the point.

Keolis Northern Beaches bus route 225 connects Cremorne and Neutral Bay wharves running via Neutral Bay Junction runs along Milson Road, the main artery of Cremorne Point.

At the 2016 Census, 33.8% of employed people travelled to work on public transport and 46.2% by car (either as driver or as passenger).

== Activities ==
The Sydney Amateur Sailing Club is located on the eastern side of the Point.
