= Hotel Grand Chancellor Townsville =

Building in Townsville, Australia

Coordinates: 19°15′34.92″S 146°49′01.7″E

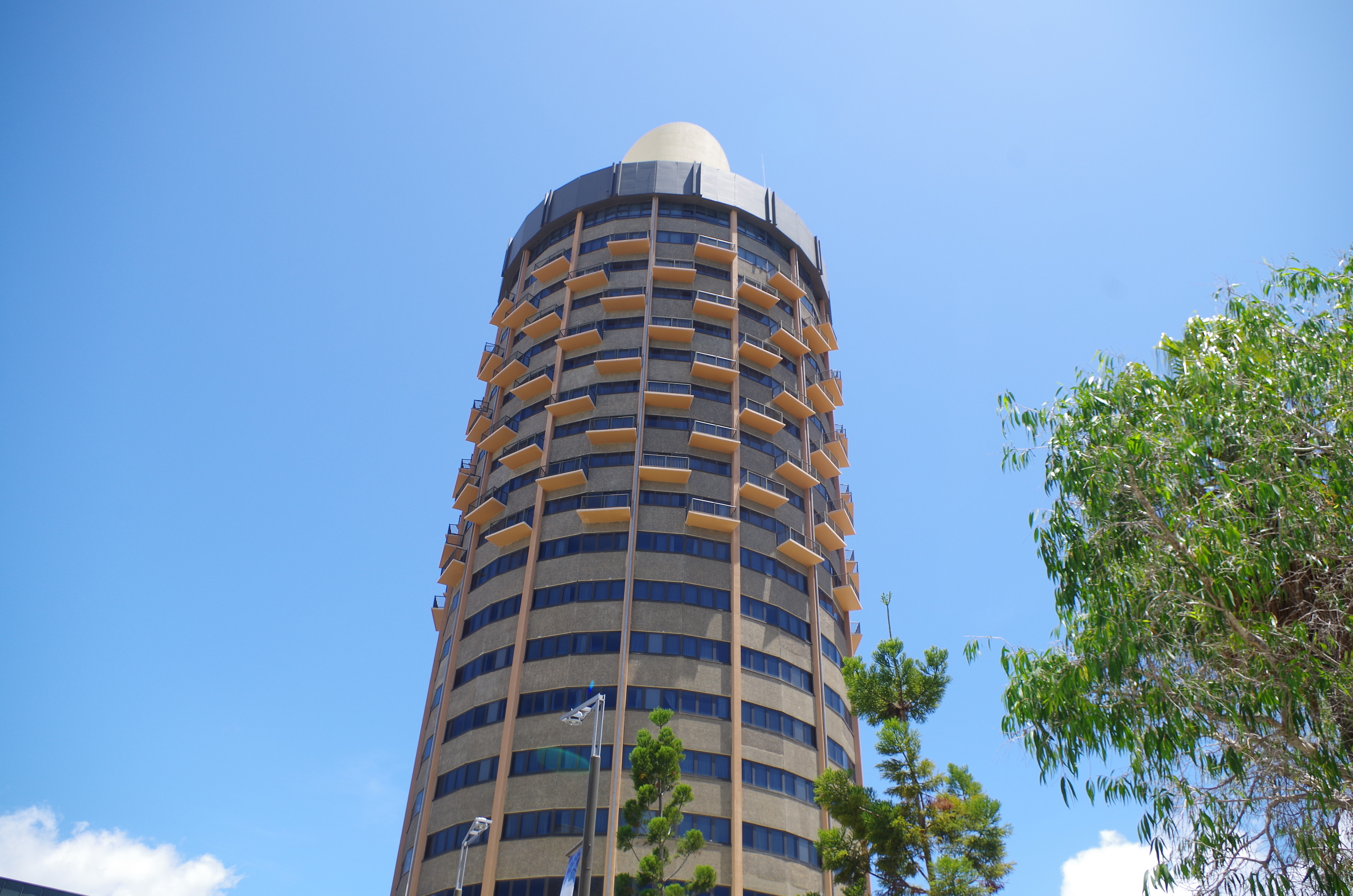
- Hotel Grand Chancellor in 2020
- Interactive map of the Hotel Grand Chancellor Townsville area
- Former names: Hotel Townsville, Travelodge, Townsville International Hotel, Centra Townsville

General information
- Type: Hotel
- Architectural style: 70's
- Location: Townsville, Australia, 320 Flinders Street
- Construction started: 1975
- Completed: 1976
- Owner: Hotel Grand Chancellor, Australia

Height
- Height: 76 metres (249 ft)

Technical details
- Floor count: 23

The Hotel Grand Chancellor Townsville, nicknamed the "Sugar Shaker" by the locals, is currently the tallest building in Townsville, Australia, standing at 76-metre (249 ft) tall. The building is located in the central section of Flinders Street next to Townsville Bulletin Square.

== History ==
The building was originally constructed in 1976 on the site of the famous old "Central Hotel" which was cleared in 1973. The hotel has gone by a number of names. It was originally called the "Hotel Townsville". It has also been known as the Centra Townsville and Townsville International Hotel, and around 2001 its name was changed from the "Centra" to Holiday Inn. Townsville.

The building has become well known as a local landmark due to the fact that it looks like a giant sugar shaker. The odd shape of the building has been said to represent the importance of sugar to the Townsville port and area. The sobriquet was derived from its similarity to the top of sugar dispensers on the tables at a Coles caffetteria that existed in the Townsville CBD from about the mid-1960s to perhaps the late 1980s. The dispensers were glass, bulbous in shape on a flattened base, with a screw on metal cap and cylindrical projecting spout in the centre, of smaller diameter than the cap. The spout was sliced away in section at about 45 degrees, much like the structure that sits atop of the building which is now known as the Sugar Shaker.

The most recent acquisition of the property took place in June 2016 with the building becoming the Hotel Grand Chancellor Townsville.
