= Pluvius (1902) =

Fire float on Sydney Harbour, Australia

Pluvius was a fire float used on Sydney Harbour, between late 1902 and around 1952, first by Sydney Harbour Trust and later by its successor Maritime Services Board. Pluvius could also be used as a conventional tugboat. Pluvius was named after Jupiter Pluvius, the Roman god of rain.

== Before Pluvius ==
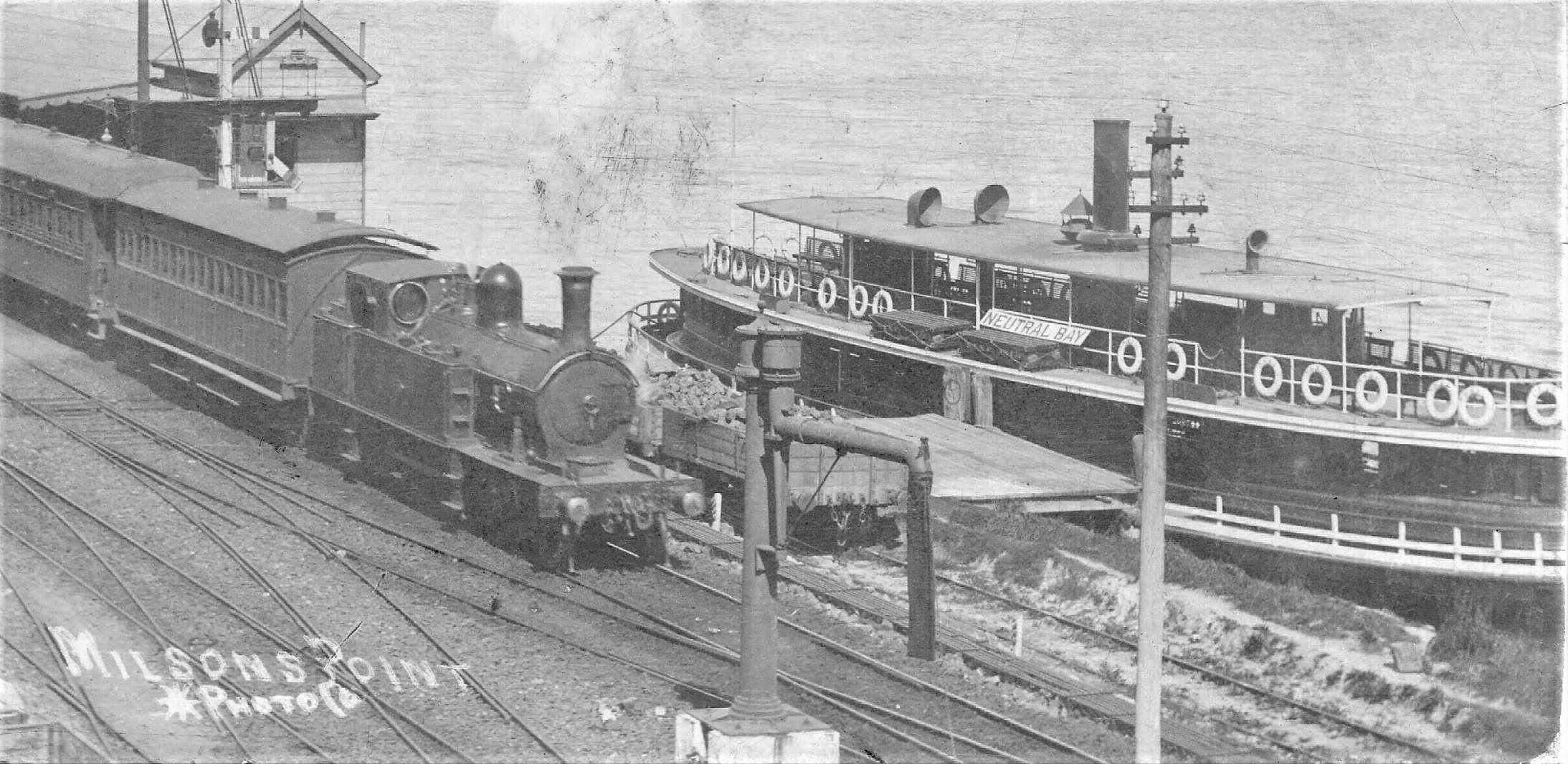
Kangaroo at Milsons Point, before the fire that gutted the ferry. In the foreground is the railway line that became an obstacle for land-based firefighters during the fire.

The need for a fire fighting boat was demonstrated by a fire aboard the ferry, Kangaroo, in October 1900. Although the ferry was moored at Milsons Point, and the fire brigade was called, fighting the fire from the shore proved ineffective. The working railway line to the old Milsons Point railway station was a significant obstacle. The ferry was gutted, leaving only the hull and some equipment in a reusable state, but was later rebuilt.

It was just one of a number of marine fires, which had occurred in the port of Sydney. After the Kangaroo fire, Inspector Webb, of the Metropolitan Fire Brigade restated his views on the matter, being quoted as saying, "We cannot do anything at present, but I hope we shall soon be in a position to take action. In the amending bill now before Parliament, and which has passed its first reading, the power is given to us to deal with ship fires, but, unfortunately, the bill has not become law yet. We have had a number of big ship fires here of late years, and the matter is one of great importance. There was the fire on the 'Buteshire,' for instance, which was destroyed at Miller's Point. With a floating fire engine we might have saved the vessel. In a great city like Sydney, with such a large port and such shipping as we have here, it is absurd to think that there is no provision for extinguishing fires aboard ship. At present we have no authority to touch them, and only do so with the consent of the interested persons, and anyway we are only able to render assistance when the boats on which fires occur happen to be alongside".

== Description ==
The hull of Pluvius was built at William Dunn's boatyard on Berrys Bay, on the northern foreshore of Sydney Harbour. The hull was hardwood, with kauri decks. She was 100ft long. 20ft beam, and 10 feet 6in deep in the hold and had a 10 foot draught. Her pumps, built by Merryweather and Sons of London, could raise 2,500 gallons of water per minute. She had six connections for standard 2½ inch diameter firehouse and one connection for a 3½ inch hose, and could also support a 7 inch suction hose for salvage purposes. Her engine was a compound type, capable of powering Pluvius to 12½ knots of speed.

As well as pumping water onto a vessel for putting out fires, more than once Pluvius was used to pump water from a leaking vessel so as to keep it afloat or maintain the vessel's boiler operation.

== Goat Island facility and other fire floats ==
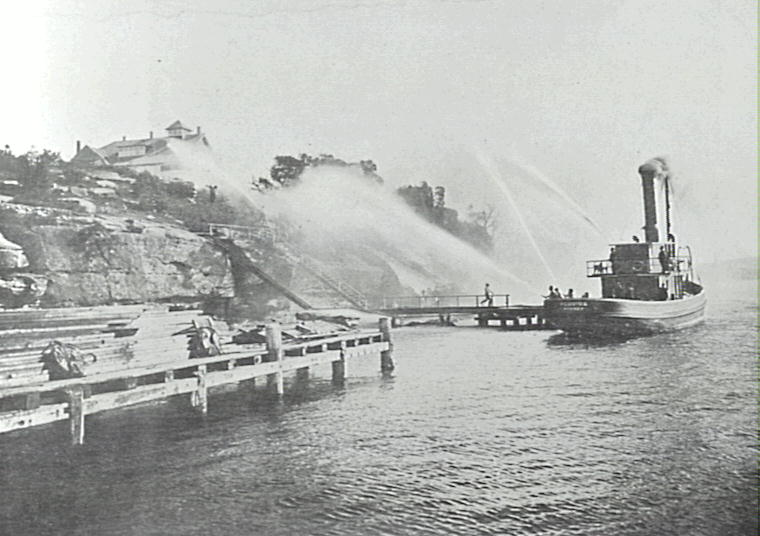
Pluvius at practice, Goat Island, July 1910.

Pluvius was located at a new marine fire station facility on Goat Island. In 1909, there was some criticism that Pluvius had insufficient capacity to fight large fires. In 1913, she was joined by a second fire float, Hydra.

The limitations of just two fire floats—Pluvius and Hydra—became apparent during the gigantic fire at the seven-storey waterside building of the Pastoral Finance Association, at Kirribilli, in 1921. By 1925, Sydney Harbour Trust operated three fire floats, Pluvius, Hydra, and Cecil Rhodes, with Pluvius being the smallest. By 1929, a fourth had been added, Achilles, and all four were being fitted with portable 'Foamite' (fire fighting foam) generators.

== Incidents and events ==
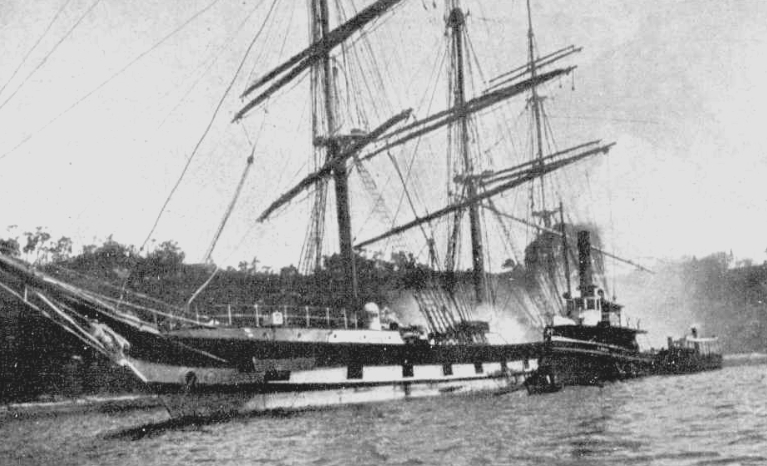
Pluvius fights the fire aboard Mount Stewart (1904)

=== Harbour fires ===
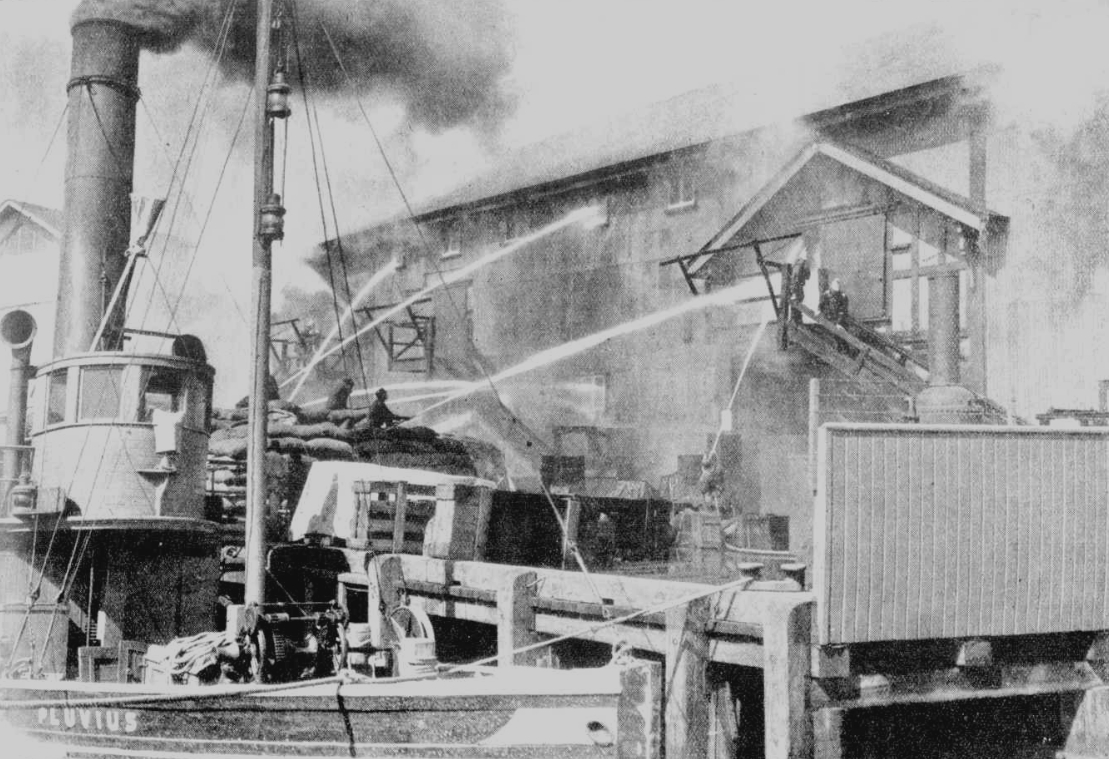
Pluvius fighting a wharf fire at Millers Point (1917).

Pluvius was called to fires on board vessels and on the waterfront, including these notable fires:

- Earl of Dunmore, while she was beached at Rose Bay, in 1903.
- Mount Stewart, while she was beached at Berrys Bay, in 1904.
- McKenzie's timber yard, at Pyrmont, in 1906.
- Workshop fire at Cockatoo Island Dockyard, in 1909.
- Saxton and Binn's timber yard at Pyrmont, in 1909.
- Penrhyn Castle, in 1910
- The ferry Kaludah, in 1911.
- The ferry Kosciusko, in 1912.
- Norddeutscher-Lloyd cargo wharf, Millers Point, on Darling Harbour, in 1914.
- The two ferries, Daphne and Leichardt, in 1916; both had been destroyed by the time Pluvius reached the scene.
- Morinda, in 1917. Initially it was thought that assistance was not required, but later at Millers Point, the seacocks had to be opened.
- Wharf at Millers Point, in 1917.
- Refined sugar store, at Colonial Sugar Refinery, Pyrmont, in October 1918.
- Matarama, an island trader, off North Head Quarantine Station, in November 1918.
- The ferry, Kameruka, at Gladesville Bridge, in December 1918.
- Konigen Luise, at Circular Quay, in 1919.
- Menado, with a cargo of copra, in Athol Bight, in April 1921.
- Pastoral Finance Association building (wool store and meat cold store), at Kirribilli, in December 1921.
- Coal bunkers of Clan Alpine, at Woolwich Dock, in February 1922.
- Coal bunkers of Ooma, at Snails Bay, Balmain, in September 1922. The fire was due to spontaneous combustion of the coal.
- R.M.S. Niagara, at Neutral Bay, in December 1922. Pluvius attended, but Niagara's crew were able to extinguish the fire unaided.
- Duroby (a collier) and Eden (anchored nearby), at Double Bay, in 1923.
- Shipbuilding yard at Cockatoo Island Dockyard, in 1926.
- The ferries, Uno and Rose, at their mornings in Five Dock Bay, near Gladesville Bridge, in 1927.
- Hudson's Timber, at Blackwattle Bay, in March 1928.
- Luxury motor cruiser, Miramar, flagship of the Royal Motor Yacht Club, at Rose Bay, in June 1928; Pluvius arrived too late to assist.
- Films and movie reels stored in the Metcalfe Bond store, at Circular Quay, in 1929.
- Time, which arrived with its cargo already on fire, in 1932.
- Audrey D., a former sixty-miler working as a steam coal lighter, in 1935. The fire, at Snails Bay, Balmain, was fought from the land, but Pluvius was used to pump her out.
- The ferry, Bellubera, at the Port Jackson and Manly Steamship Co.'s ferry depot, Kurraba Point, in 1936.
- Paint storage building at Cockatoo Island Dockyard, in 1937.
- Hunter, in 1938.
- National Box Company's factory, at Balmain, in 1944.
- Astoria, at No.7 Wharf, Walsh Bay, in 1945.
- Engine room of the cargo ship and former liner, Panamanian, moored at No.4 Wharf, Darling Harbour, in March 1946.
- Wharf 73, at West Circular Quay, in September 1946.
- Nankin, while she was unloading copra—a cargo notorious for spontaneous combustion—at White Bay, in 1947.
- Luxury motor launch, Liberty, in Neutral Bay, in 1950.

=== Other incidents and events ===
Other than fires, Pluvius was involved in other incidents and events, including:

- In December 1902, Pluvius carried Cardinal Moran, at the head of a procession of steamboats, upon his return to Sydney.
- In 1903, after a serious collision with Mildura, Argus ran onto rocks at Goat Island to prevent her sinking. Pluvius pumped her out, to keep Argus's own boilers and pumps working.
- In 1913, Pluvius was used as a temporary passenger ferry, on the route between Milsons Point and Circular Quay.
- In 1914, Mongolia collided with Pluvius near Sydney Heads.
- In 1916, Lady Rawson and Stormbird collided in Darling Harbour, and Pluvius used her pumps to stop Stormbird from sinking.
- In 1916, Pluvius struck a wharf at Darling Harbour, was damaged amidship, and despite, tying lines to the wharf, she sank, but was later raised.
- In 1923, Pluvius and a steam lighter Annie Love collided in Darling Harbour off Pyrmont.
- In 1926, Pluvius ran aground on a reef at Shark Island and was successfully refloated.
- In 1927, Pluvius and a steam lighter Lucy collided in Darling Harbour.
- In 1927, Pluvius searched for survivors of the Greycliffe disaster.
- In 1928, after a steam lighter Coopernook and a tug Sterling collided in Darling Harbour, Pluvius used her pumps to keep the damaged tug afloat.
- In 1929, three fully-laden timber lighters broke away from moorings in Rozelle Bay, during a gale. Pluvius and the tug Antarctica retrieved them.
- In 1929, Canberra, struck its tug, Hero, and holed her. Hero beached in Johnstons Bay, and Pluvius pumped her out, until patching was in place.
- In 1930, Pluvius ran aground on a sandbank off Darling Point.
- In 1931, Pluvius and Cecil Rhodes used their pumps to raise the sunken coastal steamer Wodonga, in Kerosene Bay (Balls Head Bay).
- In 1934, the ferry Baragoola struck a whale. When its carcass resurfaced near the Quarantine Station, Pluvius had the task of towing it out to sea.
- In 1938, Paterson and Pluvius collided off Blues Point.
- In 1946, Pluvius and two other tugs pulled the Manly ferry Dee Why off a rock shelf at Obelisk Bay, where it had run aground during a fog.

== Fate ==
Pluvius, a coal-fuelled steamer, suffered from the disadvantage that it needed to have raised steam before attending fires. Consequently, the fire floats were kept 'steamed up', in readiness for relatively infrequent events. Once motor vessels became more common, it was inevitable that the aging fire floats would be replaced. Pluvius was the oldest and smallest of the fire floats.

Around 1952, Pluvius and Hydra were replaced by two new fire floats, Burrawaree and Boray, and a third new fire float Bennelong was added to the fleet. By mid 1957, what remained of Pluvius—by then, a hulk—was used for dredging work in Homebush Bay. Pluvius was disposed of in 1959.
