= Kummulla =

Ferry in Sydney, Australia

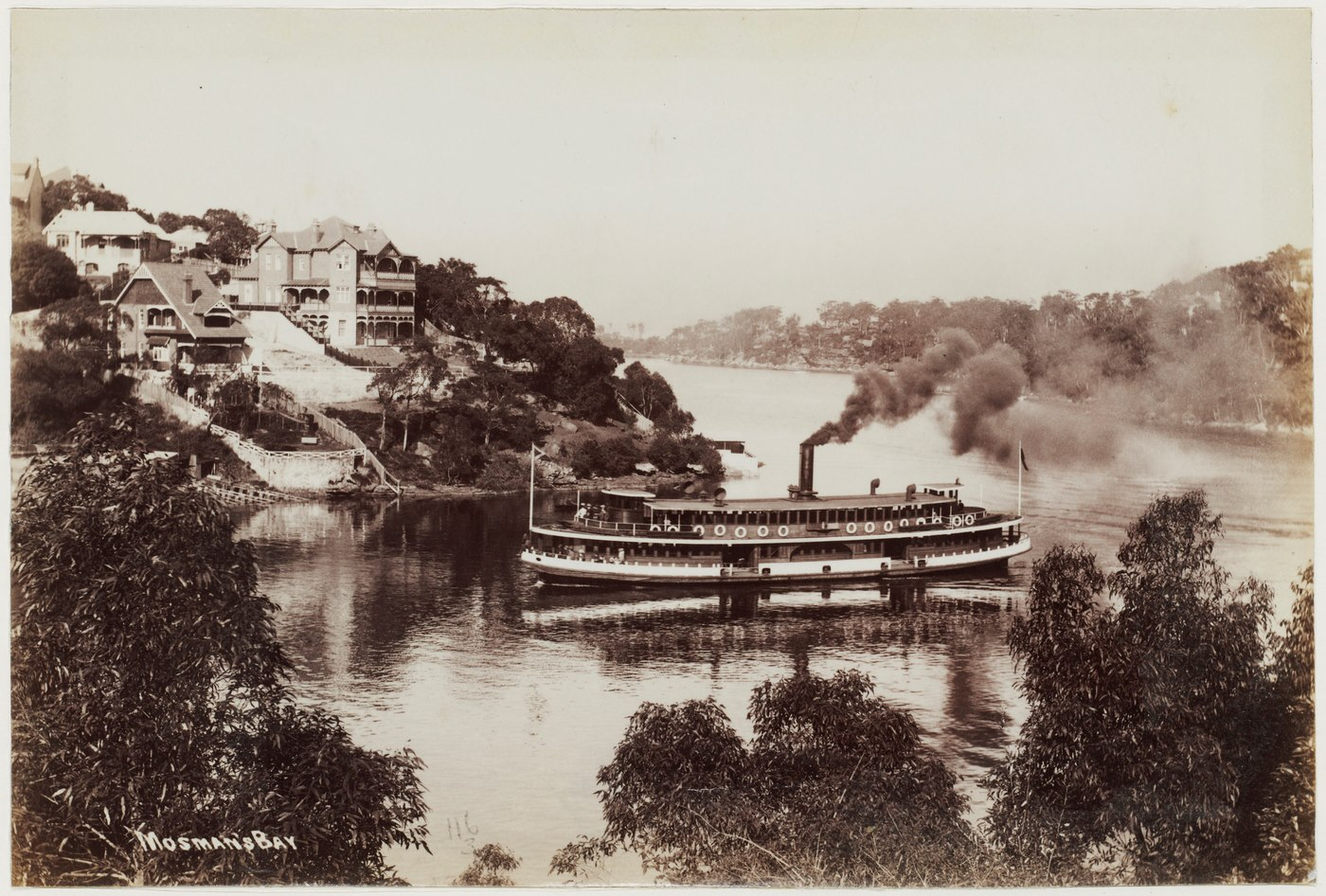
- Kummulla in Mosman Bay

History
- Name: Kummulla
- Operator: Sydney Ferries Limited
- Builder: Dunn Brothers, Berrys Bay
- Launched: 1902
- Completed: 1903
- Out of service: 1934
- Fate: Scrapped 1939

General characteristics
- Tonnage: 168
- Length: 36.3 m
- Beam: 7.6 m
- Speed: 12 knots
- Capacity: 795

Kummulla was a "K-class" ferry on Sydney Harbour. Launched in 1903, the timber-hulled steamer was built for Sydney Ferries Limited during the boom in cross-harbour ferry travel prior to the opening of the Sydney Harbour Bridge. She was decommissioned in 1934 after the 1932 opening of the Bridge.

== Background ==
Kummulla was built for Sydney Ferries Limited during the early twentieth century boom in cross-Harbour travel prior to the 1932 opening of the Sydney Harbour Bridge. At the time, the company ran one of the largest ferry fleets in the world. The ferry was part of broader type of around 20 double-ended timber screw ferries - the Sydney K-class ferries - that the company commissioned between the 1890s and early 1920s to meet the booming demand.

Kummulla followed the Sydney Ferries Limited convention of naming their vessels after Australian Aboriginal words starting with "K". "Kummulla" is thought to mean "catch me".

== Design and construction ==
Described as a "small edition of the [1902 ferry] Koree, she was one of the earlier of the "K-class" ferries. Kummulla was designed by Mr. James Scott (foreman of the North Coast S.N. Company's works) and built in 1903 by Dunn Brothers of Berry's Bay in North Sydney. Typical of the K-class, she was a timber double-ended double-screw steam ferry with two passenger decks and a wheelhouse at each end. As with several of the other earlier K-class vessels, her upper deck was not enclosed for its entire length having partially-open passenger seating immediately behind the two wheelhouses. The 1905 K-class ferry, Kareela was the first of the type to be built with fully enclosed upper decks between the wheelhouses. In comparison to other K-class ferries, Kummulla's bow and stern were particularly up-swept with steep lower decks. Initially provided with two gangways on either side, a third in between the other two, was later provided making her similar to the other "K-class" ferries.

The specification for the machinery, boilers, and electric light installation was prepared by Thomas Brown (Works Engineer for the Sydney Ferries Company). Her engines were imported from Lees, Anderson and Co of Glasgow and could push her to 11 knots. They were 31 hp compound inverted direct acting surface condensing steam engines with two cranks and right angles. The cylinder diameters were 14 inch and 27 inch with length of stroke being 18 inch. Her two through multi-tubular cylindrical boilers (6 ft 6in internal diameter and 18 ft long) were tested to a working pressure of 120 1b to the square inch, and were provided with Deighton's patent suspension furnace.

Kummulla's hull was launched on 7 August 1902.

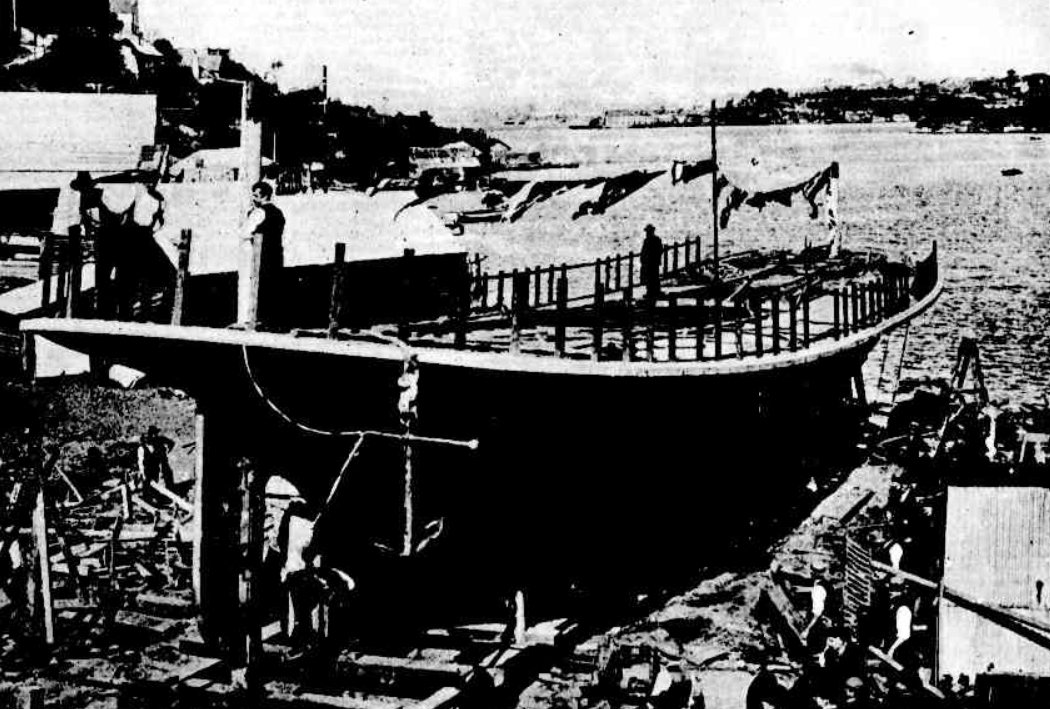
Launch day, 7 August 1902 at Dunn Brothers yard, Berry's Bay in North Sydney

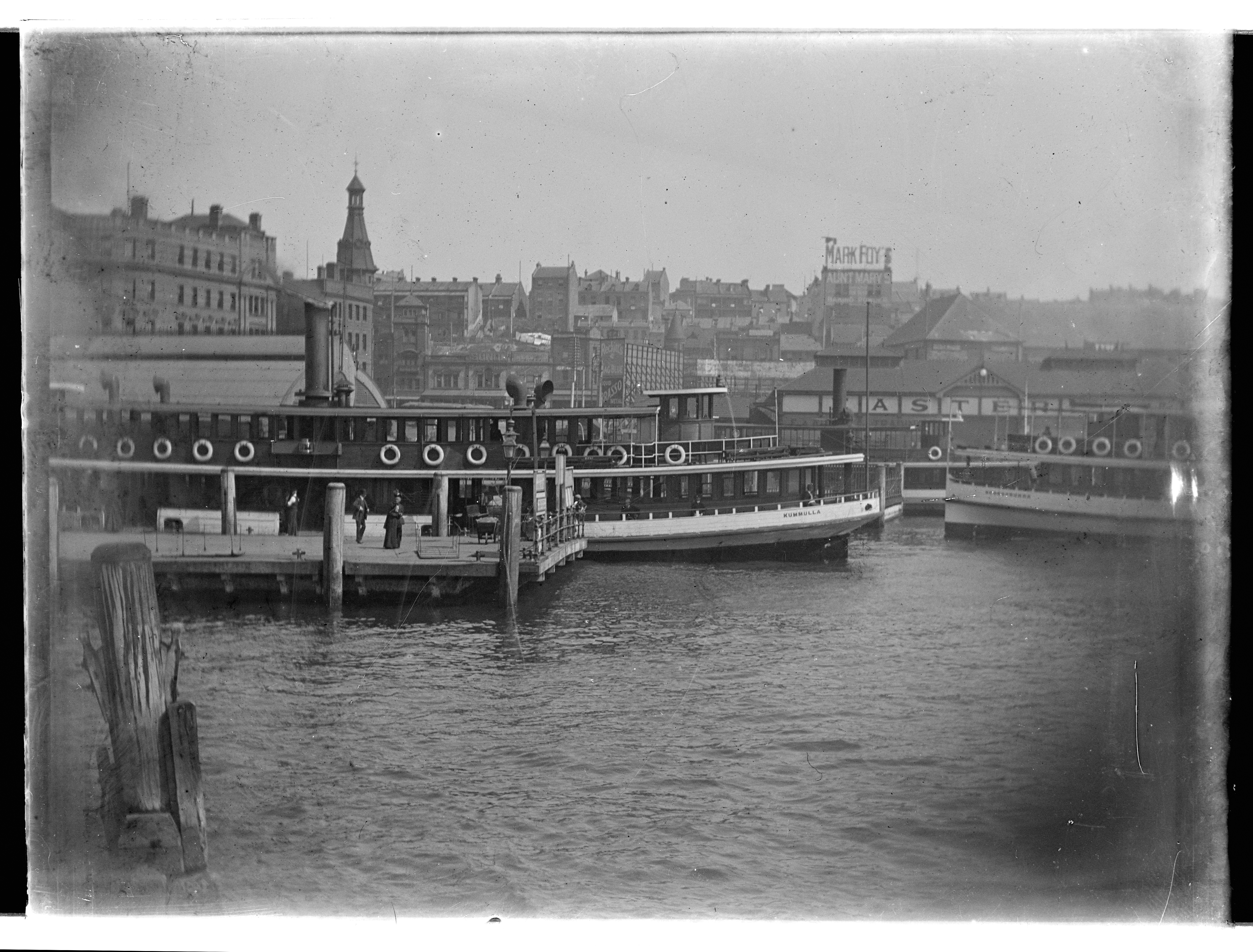
At Circular Quay showing her partially open upper decks. From 1905, all "K-class ferries" would be fully enclosed to the wheelhouses. The Lady-class ferries introduced in the 1960s and 1970s would re-introduce this feature.

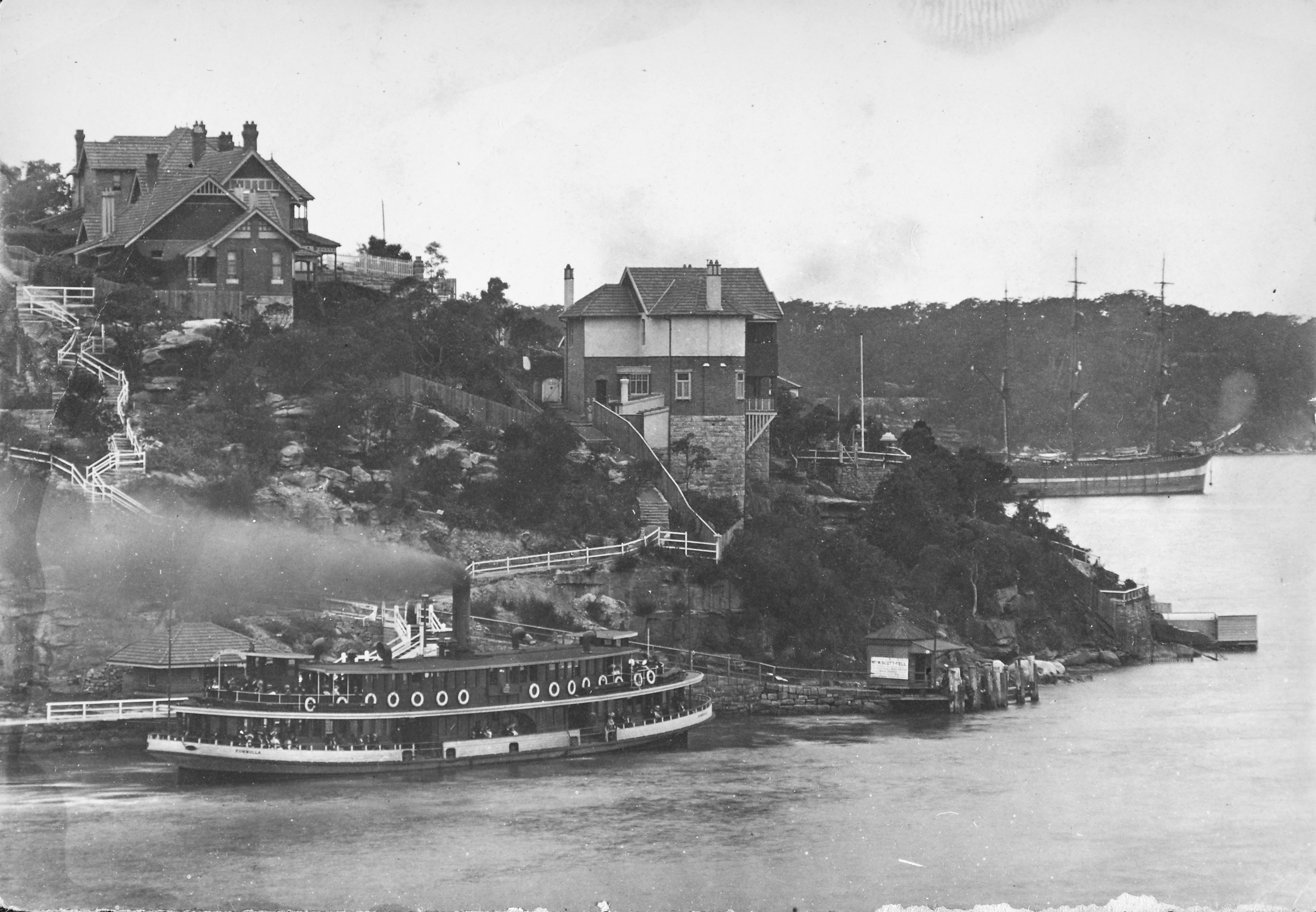
At Musgrave Street Wharf (now South Mosman ferry wharf), 1914

== Service history ==
Kummulla's official trials were on 15 January 1903 where she attained 11 knots. The next day, The Australian Star newspaper described her as "the prettiest steamer of the Sydney Ferries Limited fleet of modern harbour steamers". The Sydney Morning Herald described her as "distinct advance upon any of the vessels running in the Mosman service" and "elaborately furnished". Kummulla was built for the Mosman Bay service and also served the Circular Quay to Lavender Bay run.

In 1932, the Sydney Harbour Bridge was opened, and Sydney Ferries Limited's annual patronage dropped from 40 million to about 15 million. As part of economy measures, older and/or most of the larger steamers were put up for sale. Kummulla was laid up for sale in 1934.

Her engine was removed in 1935, she was hulked, and her hull sold for scrapping in 1939.

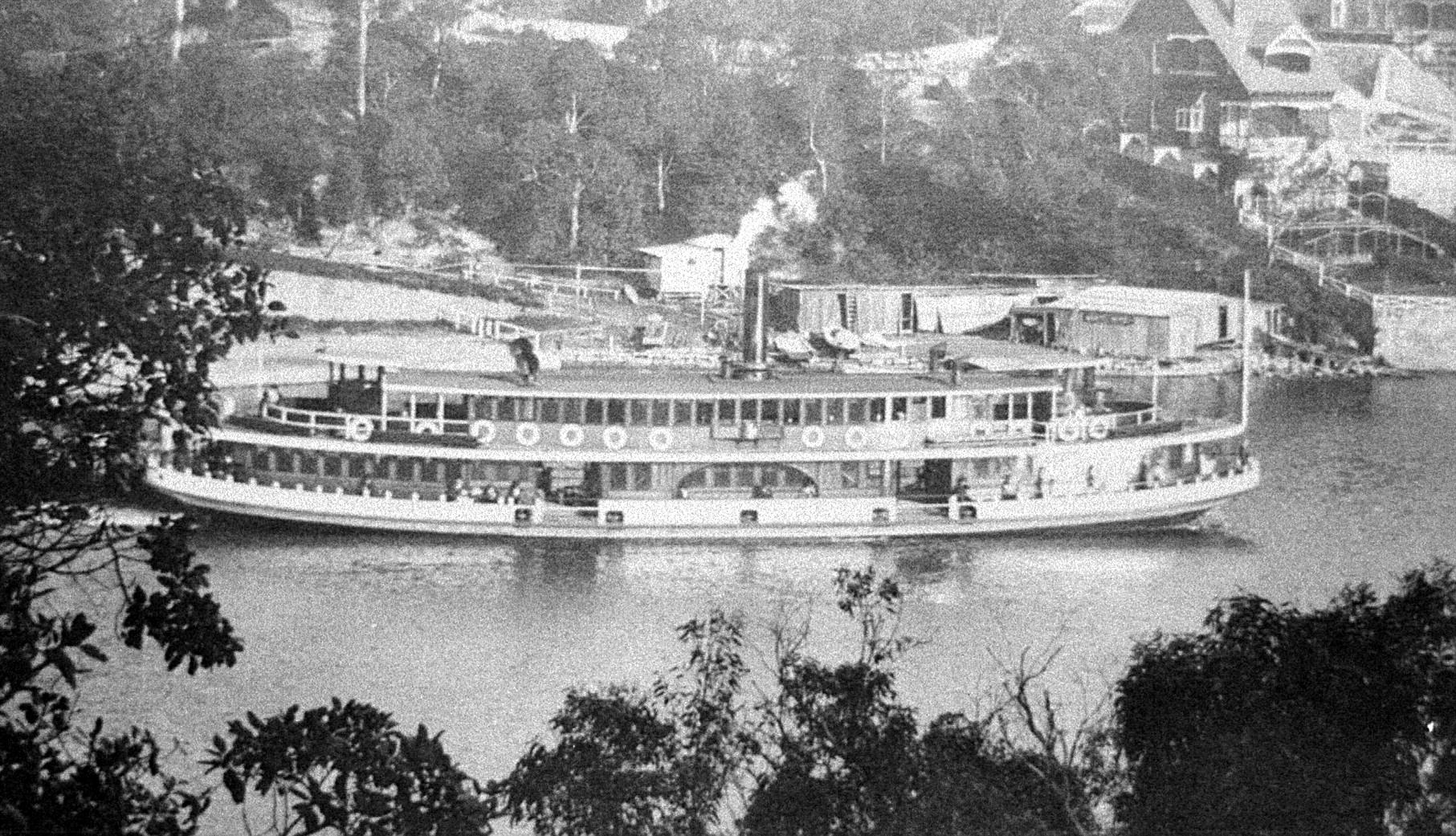
As a new ferry, Mosman Bay, 1903

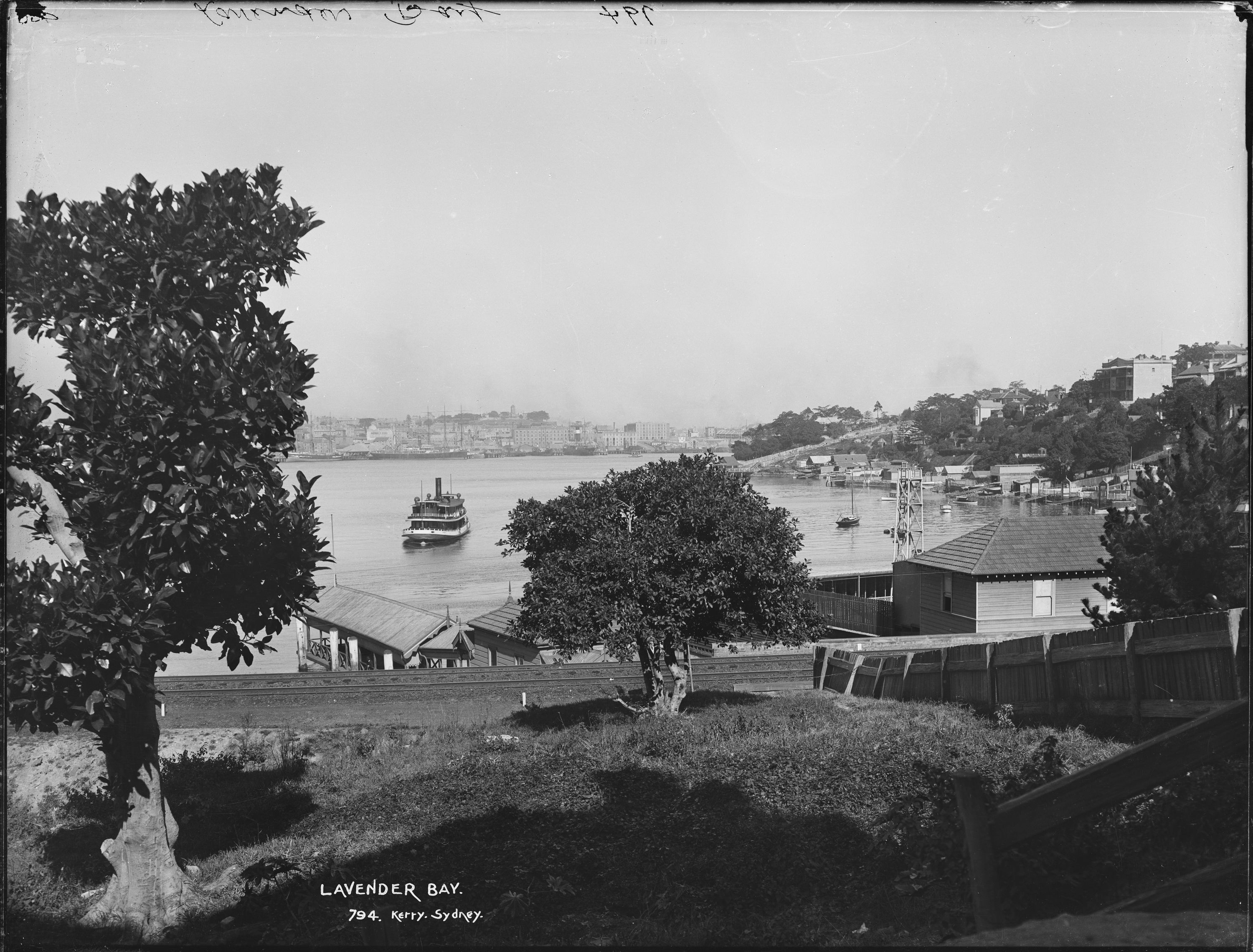
In Lavender Bay

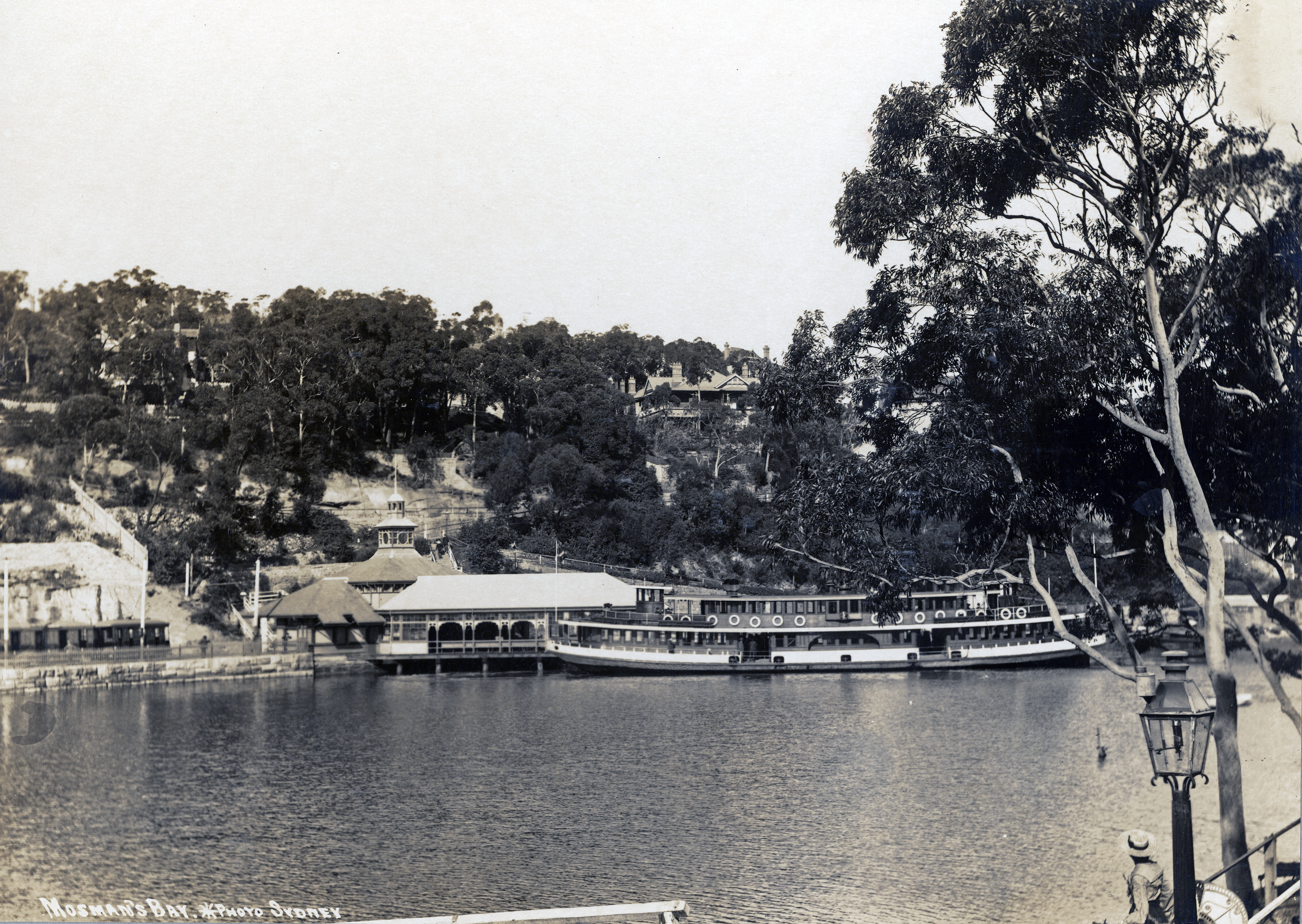
At Mosman Bay wharf ca 1910

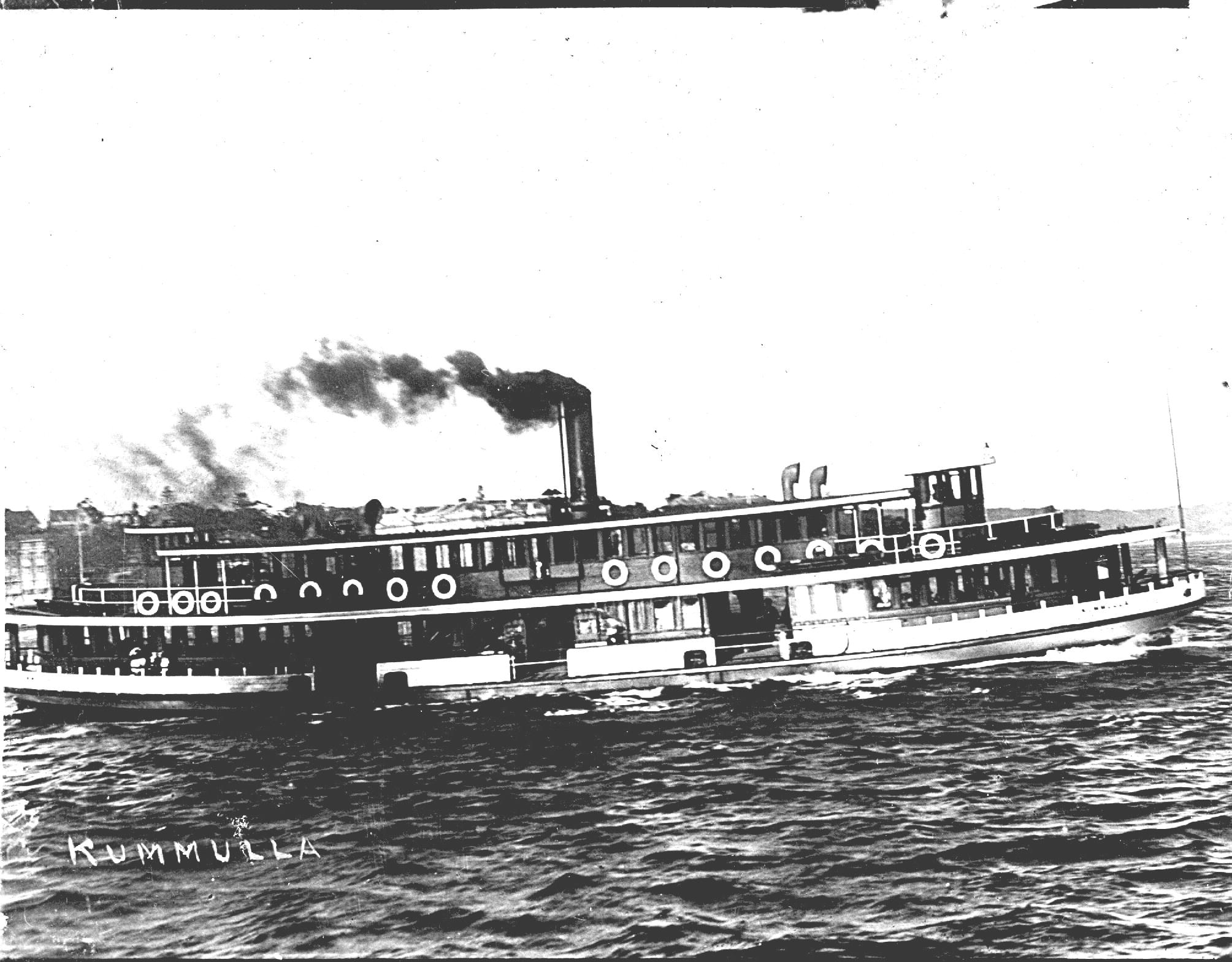
After third gangway was added

=== Incidents ===
- On 30 August 1909, Kummulla collided with steam launch, Vivid, causing considerable damage to both vessels. Kummulla's steering was disable and there were fears that Vivid might sink, with the master of the Vivid found to be at fault.
- In July 1911, she collided with Sydney Ferries Ltd ferry Kangaroo between Lavender Bay and Dawes Point.
- She collided with Vaucluse in July 1919 and was out of service for several weeks for repairs. In August 1921, she struck the vehicular ferry Benelon in thick fog. Benelon's steering gear and bulwarks were damaged. Shortly after on the same day, with a thick fog diminishing visibility, the Benelon soon collided with the ferry Woollahra.
- In 1927, Kummulla was the first vessel to arrive on the scene of the Greycliffe disaster. The Watson's Bay ferry, Greycliffe, had been struck by the liner RMS Tahiti cutting the ferry into two and sinking it. Kummulla's crew diverted her from her run to Mosman and rescued passengers from the water, a number of whom were injured. Those rescued on Kummulla were taken to waiting ambulances at Mosman Bay.

== See also ==
- List of Sydney Harbour ferries
- Sydney K-class ferries
