= Kaludah =

Sydney K-class ferry, burned in 1911

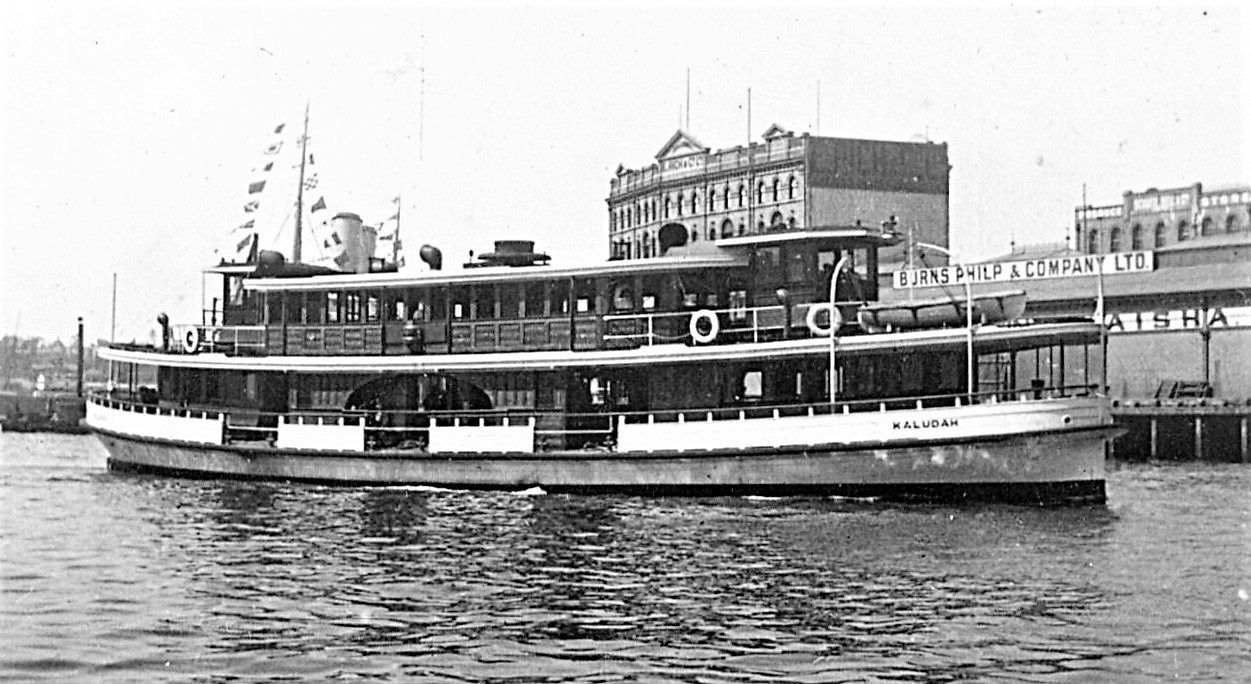
- Kaludah in Sydney Cove

History
- Name: Kaludah
- Operator: Sydney Ferries Limited
- Builder: Morrison and Sinclair, Balmain
- Cost: £12,000
- Launched: 1908 as Kuranda
- In service: 1909 as Kaludah
- Out of service: 22 March 1911
- Fate: Burnt out and sank

General characteristics
- Class & type: K-class double-ended ferry
- Tonnage: 137 tons
- Length: 35.1 m (115 ft 2 in)
- Beam: 7.6 m (24 ft 11 in)
- Installed power: 50 hp (37 kW) triple expansion steam
- Propulsion: Double-ended screw
- Speed: 12 kn (22 km/h; 14 mph)
- Capacity: 600 (est)

Kaludah (launched as Kuranda) was a K-class ferry on Sydney Harbour, Australia. Commissioned in 1909, the timber-hulled steamer was built for Sydney Ferries Limited during the boom in cross-harbour ferry travel prior to the 1932 opening of the Sydney Harbour Bridge. Like the other "K-class" ferries, she was double-deck, double-ended, steam-powered screw ferry. However, she and the larger but otherwise similar Kookooburra (1907), were the only two K-class ferries designed by naval architect Walter Reeks and not Sydney Ferries Limited's Captain Summerbell.

Kaludah was built by Morrison and Sinclair Limited of Balmain. She was launched in late 1908 as Kuranda and commissioned the following year and her name changed to Kaludah.

Kaludah burnt out and sank near Gladesville in 1911 when she was still the newest ferry in the Sydney Ferries Limited fleet. She is one of the shortest lived of Sydney's ferries.

== Background, design and construction ==
Kaludah was built for Sydney Ferries Limited during the early twentieth century boom in cross-Harbour travel prior to the 1932 opening of the Sydney Harbour Bridge. She was one of a broader type of timber double-ended screw ferries known as the K-class. The company built 25 of these vessels between the 1890s and early 1920s to meet the booming demand. The K-class were all propelled by triple expansion steam engines and, like Kaludah, were predominantly timber-hulled (four later K-class had steel hulls).

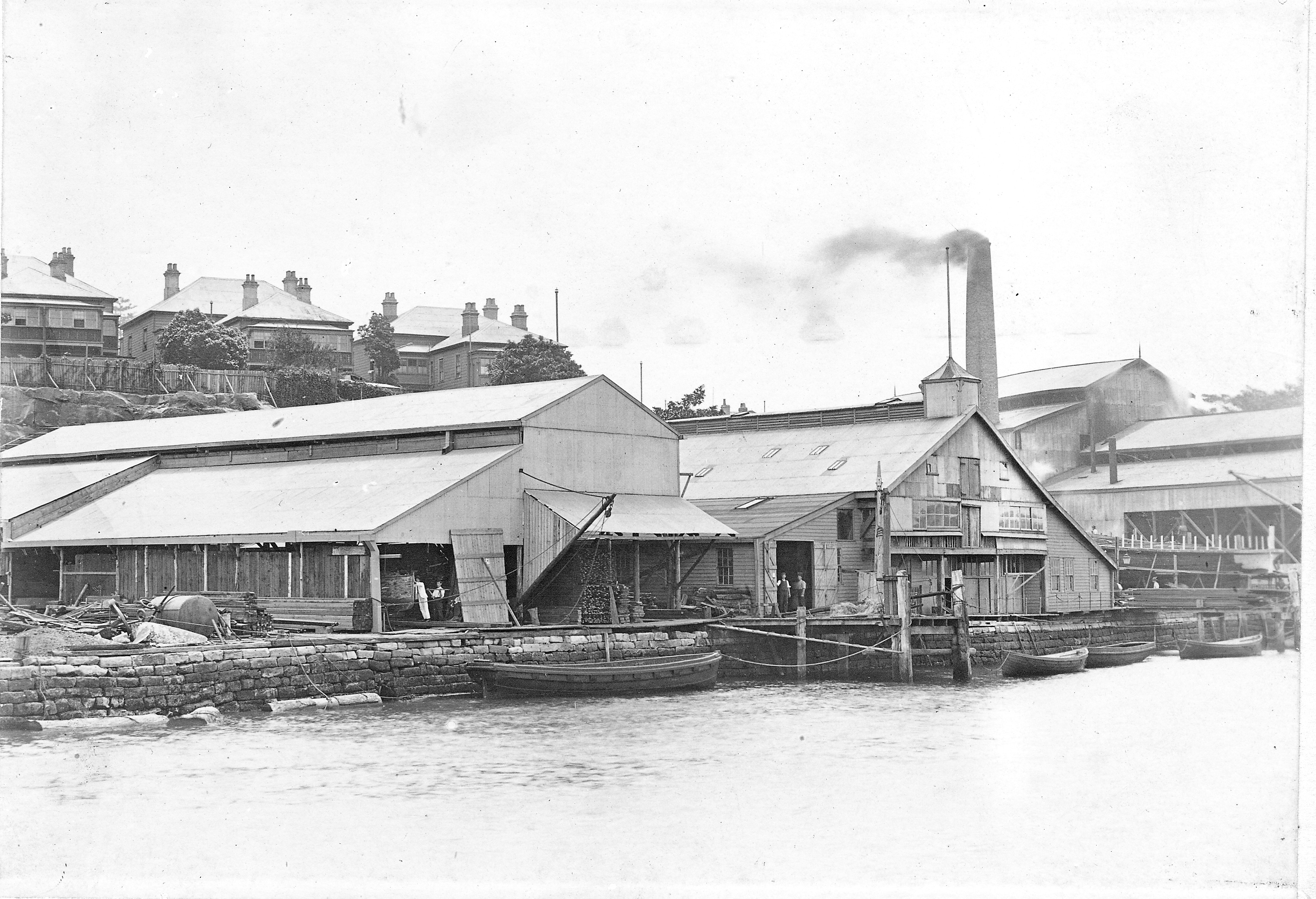
Kaludah (partly obscured, right) under construction at Morrison & Sinclair yards, White Bay Balmain

Kaludah's design was similar to that of the Sydney Ferries Limited's larger 1907 steamer Kookooburra. The two ferries were a response to Sydney Ferries Limited's need for new vessels on the longer-distance Parramatta River service and a ruling from the Maritime Services Board that from 1912, all vessels using Circular Quay must be of a double-ended nature because of congestion in the Quay. All the vessels operating on the Parramatta River service to that point were single-ended vessels.

Rather than using Captain Summerbell who had designed Sydney Ferries Limited's deep draft, round-ended steamers, the company engaged renowned naval architect, Walter Reeks, to design high speed, shallow draft vessels for the Parramatta River service. Reeks, who had designed the Balmain New Ferry Company ferries and also the Port Jackson Manly Steamship Company's Manly (II) and Kuring-gai, insisted on pointed bows for the ferries to achieve the speed necessary for the river. The company board had, to that point, a policy that all vessel bows were to be a rounded shape to give a tradition at a time when the Balmain New Ferry Company had pointed bows on their vessels (such as on the Lady class ferries). Also unique among the 25 K-class ferries, Kookooburra and Kaludah were built with short funnels, with forced draft, to pass under low bridges on Parramatta River service.

Kookooburra did not perform well on the Parramatta River service creating too much wash which was the source of much resident complaints. She was later placed on the Mosman, Neutral Bay and Taronga Zoo services and a taller funnel provided. With Kaludah, designed and built approximately two years after Kookooburra, Reeks was able to refine the design. Kaludah was a more successful boat, reaching speeds of up to 13 knots while creating minimal wash. Sydney Ferries Limited did not build more pointed-bow ferries, continuing their rounded bow tradition until their final K-class ferries in the early 1920s.

Kaludah was built of hardwood and kauri with bent frames. She had five bulk heads, four of which were iron. The ladies cabin was lined with Queensland maple. Chapman and Co installed the machinery which was imported from Campbell & Calderwood in Scotland. The triple expansion steam engines had cylinders of diameter 12-inch, 20-inch, and 32.5 inch, with stroke length of 18-inches. She had two boilers each 18 feet long and 6 feet 9 inches in diameters with a working pressure of 180 lb. Her engines produced 50 hp and propelled her to 12 knots.

== Service history ==
Kaludah was launched, and named as Kuranda, on 9 December 1908 by Miss Enid Russell. The press at the time of the launch noted she was built for Sydney Ferry Limited's semi-sea service around Middle Head.

At 10pm on Christmas Eve 1908, the Balmain New Ferry Company ferry, Lady Rawson, struck heavily against Stephen Street wharf at Bald Rock, Balmain, and continued on colliding with the hull of ferry Kuranda that had been launched a few weeks before. Lady Rawson suffered considerable damage but completed her trip to Sydney.

The ferry's use of the name Kuranda appears to have been short lived; a larger interstate steamer already carried the name. In May 1909, "Kaludah" was reported to have been recently handed over to her new owners, and a July 1909 Sydney Morning Herald article noted "The Kaludah, formerly Kuranda, commenced running in the Parramatta River service in May."

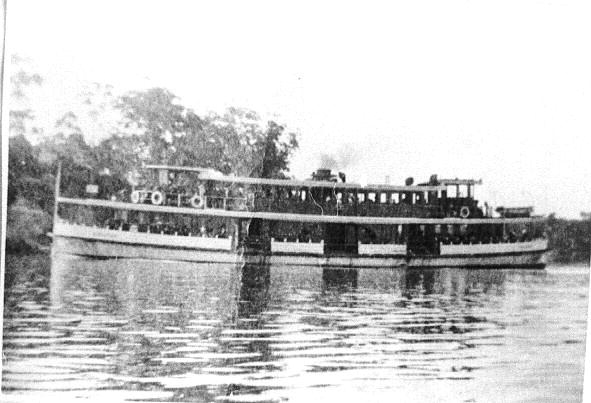
On the Parramatta River, circa 1910

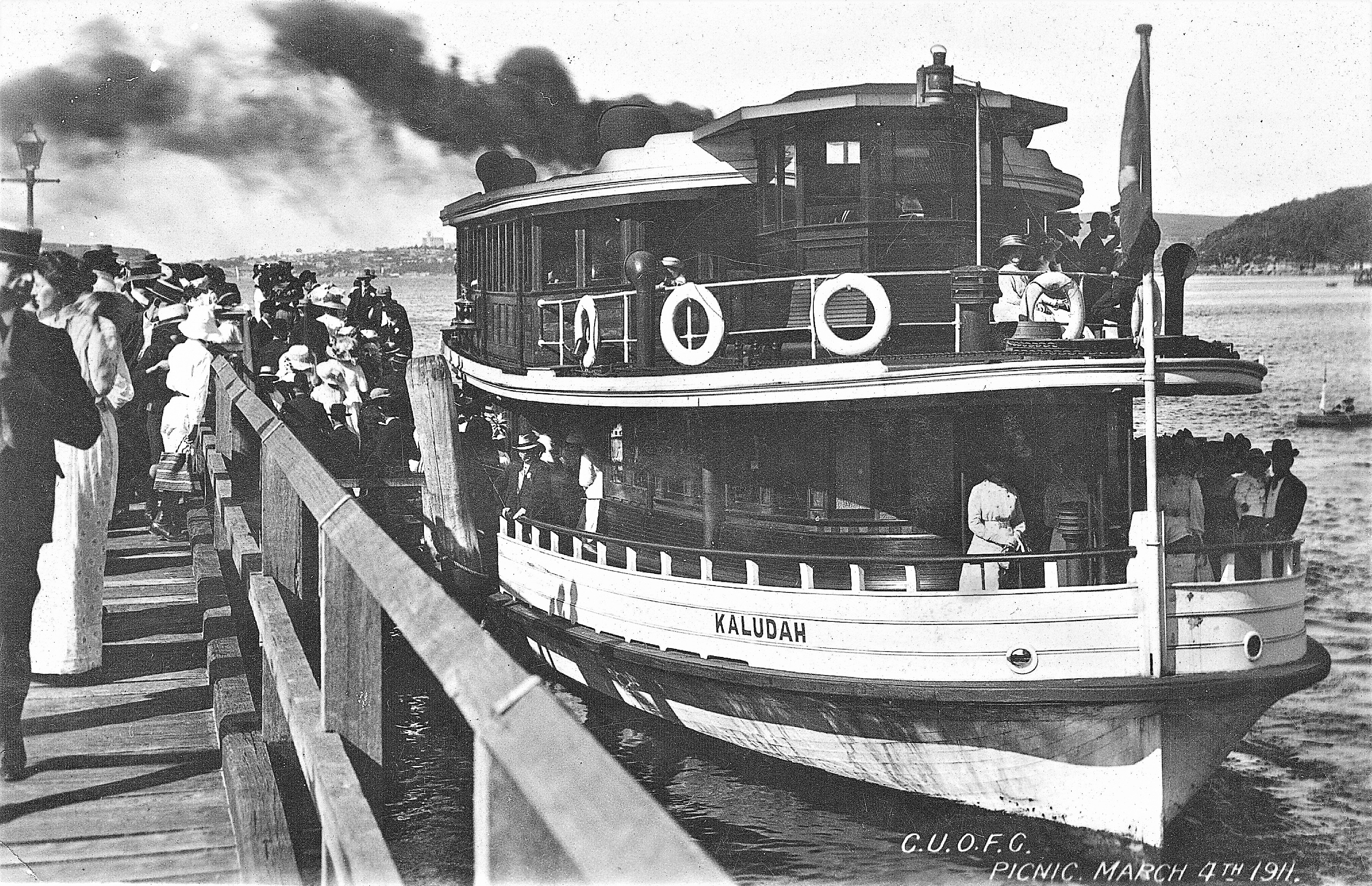
Kaludah at Balmoral Beach, 18 days before her March 1911 fire, on a Grand Union of Free Gardeners picnic at Balmoral Beach.

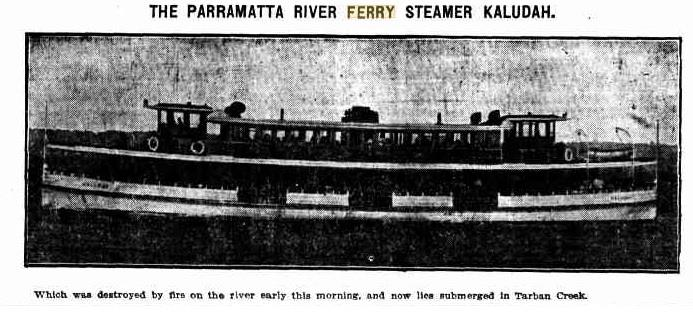
Image accompanying newspaper report of the fire

== Fire ==
When she was still the newest vessel in the Sydney Ferries fleet, Kaludah caught fire at the Gladesville bridge wharf on 22 March 1911. Burnt almost to the waterline, she was one of the shortest lived of any Sydney ferry. The night before the fire, the vessel had been moored to the Gladesville Bridge wharf after her final trip for the day. A deck hand slept aboard as usual. At 5.17 am, Andrew Adams, a passing tramway starter on a tram in Drummoyne Avenue Drummoyne noticed flames issuing from the vessel about amidships. He and William Fisher, the night bridge-keeper, rushed down to the Kaludah. The two called out waking the deckhand sleeping aboard. With flames preventing him leaving his cabin through the door, he climbed out a window and escaped onto the wharf along a rope.

The fire burnt through the ferry's lines and she drifted downstream after which flames were reported to have broken out in several locations. She was taken under tow by the fire boat Pluvius which doused her with water. She burnt to the water line, and was beached at low tide in Tarban Creek near Villa Maria, being submerged on the high tide.

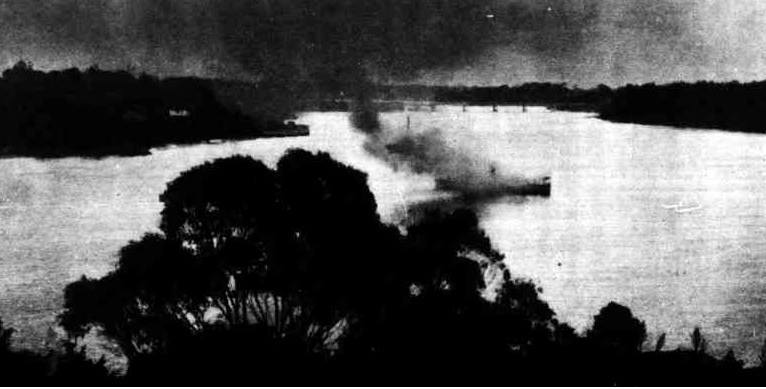
Kaludah alight at Gladesville

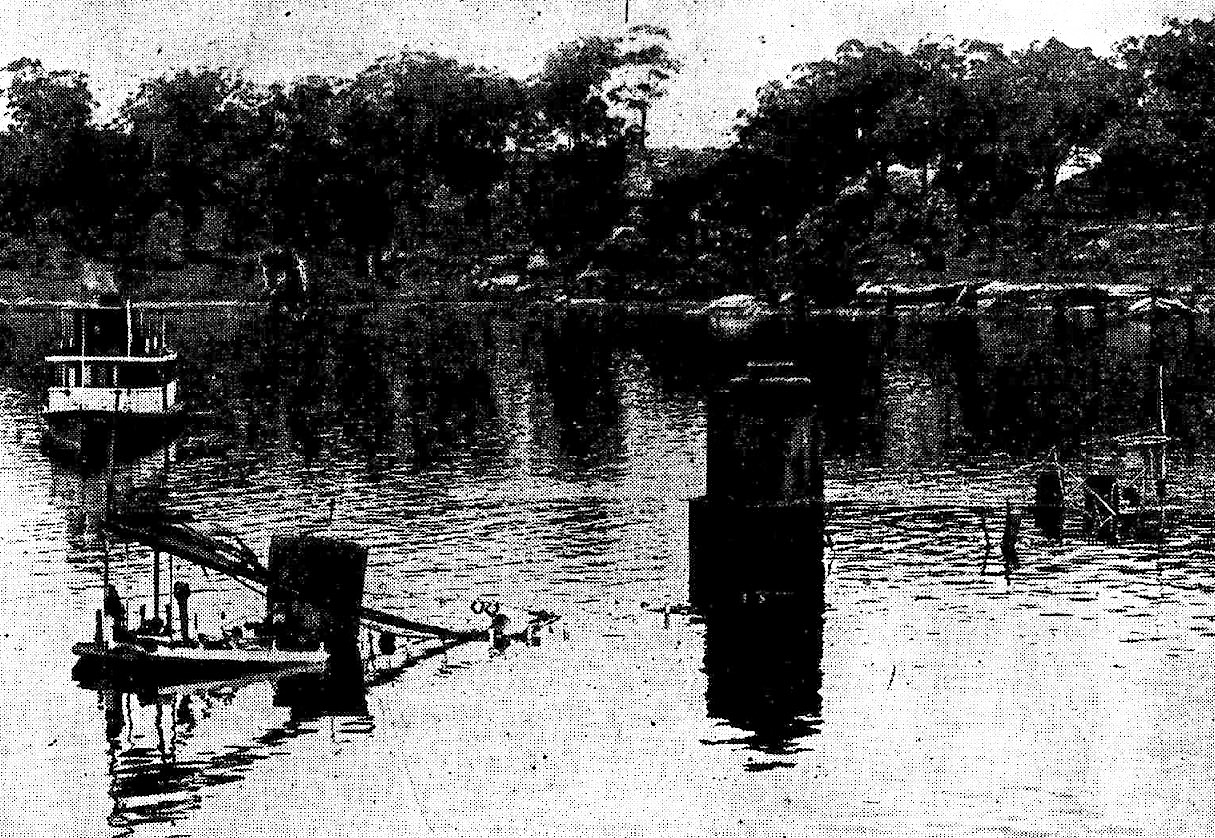
Kaludah on the mud flats at Tarban Creek

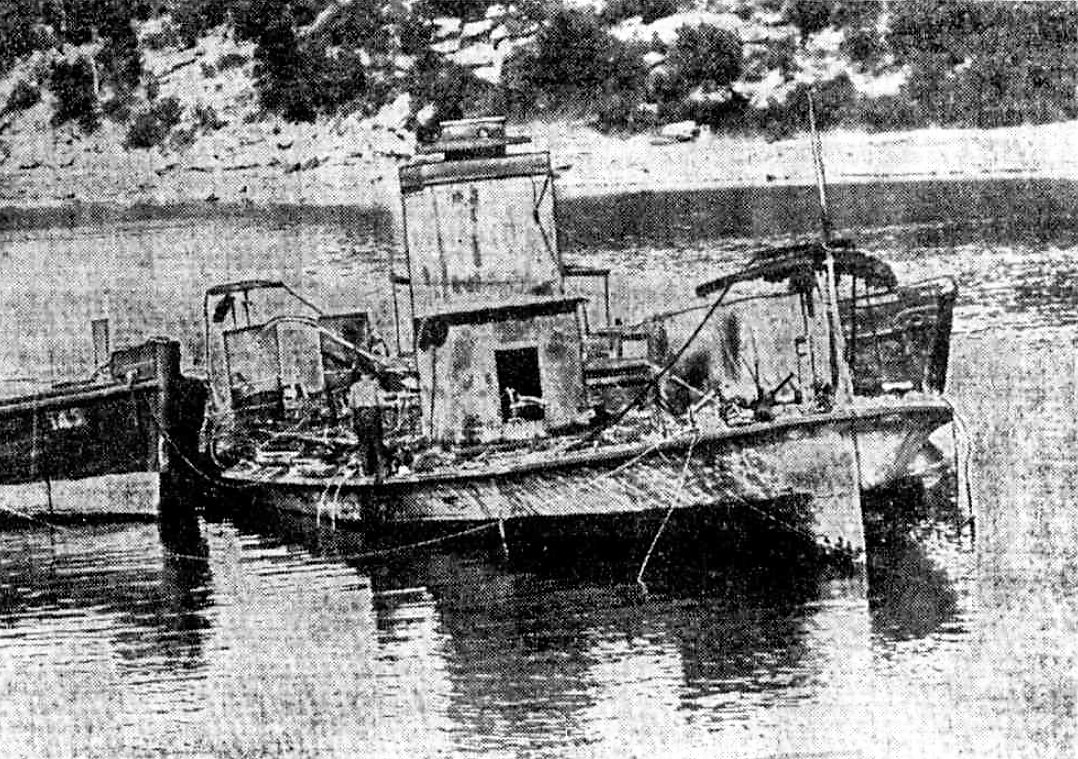
Kaludah after being raised and towed to Kerosene Bay

== Enquiry ==
An enquiry into the incident was held at the City Coroner's Court during late March and early April 1911. WG Todd, manager of Sydney Ferries Limited, represented the ferry company, while insurers, Norwich Union Insurance Company, who had insured the vessel for £9,000 were represented by Mr Rooke.

The deckhand noted that the fire appeared to be coming from the stokehold and that subsequently there were two or three explosions in quick succession, apparently from the engine room. A witness suggested that the explosions may have been caused by the tank in the ladies saloon. Other witnesses said that it may have been emergency detonators kept on board.

Sydney Ferries Limited's superintendent for the Parramatta River service said that the master of the ferry had ensured the boat was properly moored, the steam had been shut-off, the electric lighting turned off, and the fires had been banked. The deckhand reported that he saw to the removal of the ashes from the steamer. A witness said there had previously been a small fire on Kaludah that had broken out under one of the boilers. It had caused minimal damage, but its cause was not known, and special instructions had since been given as a precaution against subsequent fire.

The Coroner Hawkins closed the case without inspecting the vessel, returning a verdict confirming that Kaludah was totally destroyed by fire but was unable to confirm the cause of the fire, either accidental or otherwise. The insurer noted they were satisfied the fire was accidental.

== Salvage and Kamiri ==
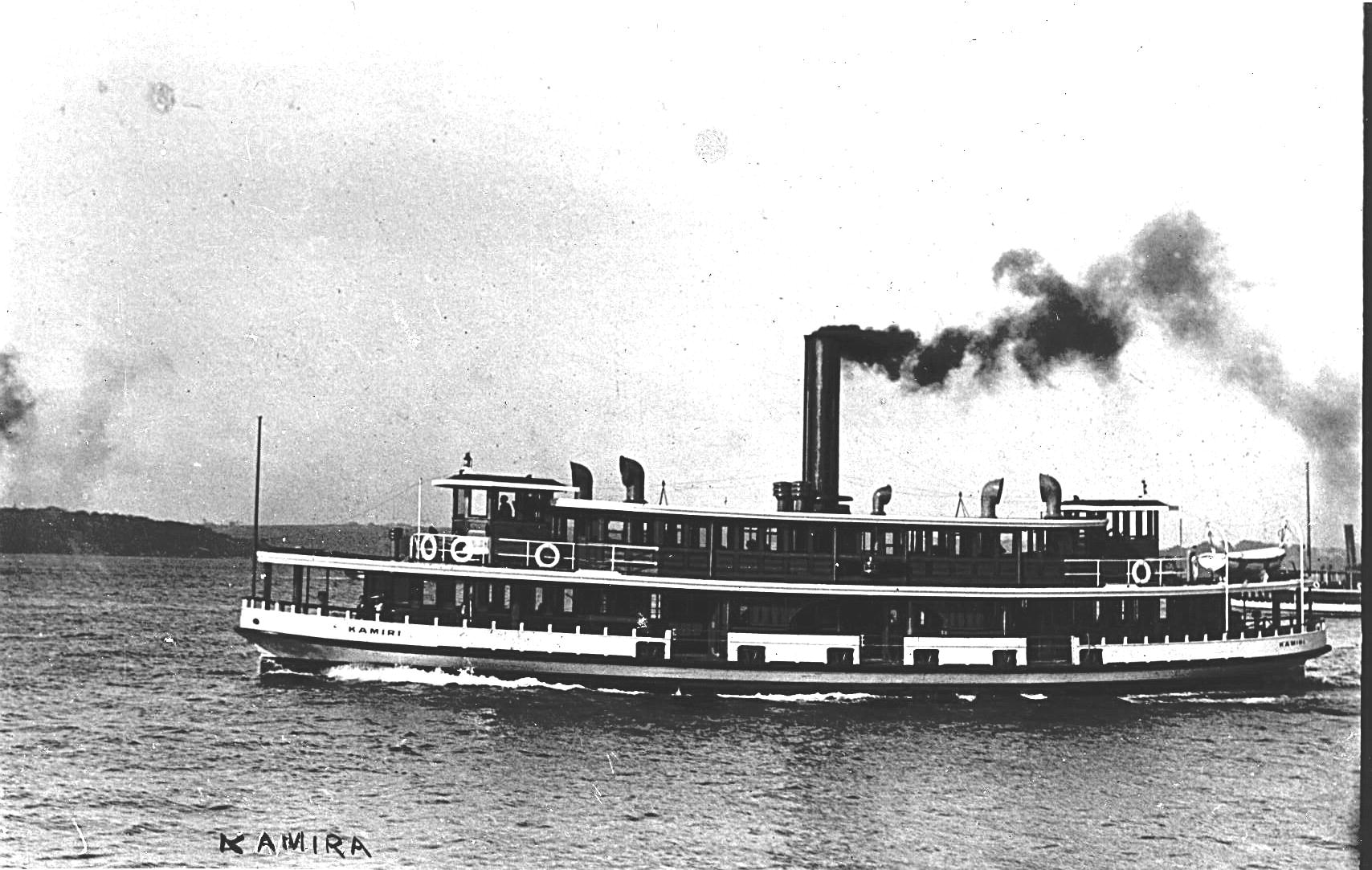
Kamiri, shown in the year of her launch (1912), took Kaludah's refurbished engines and dynamo. Some reports say Kamiri also took Kaludah's remaining timbers, while others say Kamiri was built on the remains of Kaludah's hull

Kaludah was raised on 4 April 1911 by Einerson Bros of Balmain using a series of lighters and towed to Kerosene Bay in North Sydney. It had taken two weeks preparatory work before the raising, with a failed attempt on 2 April before the successful attempt two days later.

The hull was sold in-situ at Kerosene Bay by auction on 16 May 1911 by Frazer Uther & Co to Einerson Bros for £40. The engine and dynamo were used in Sydney Ferries Limited's next new ferry, Kamiri, which was a more conventional version of a K-class ferry. Press at the time of Kamiri's 1912 launch and construction, noted that she was intended to replace Kaludah on the Parramatta River service and that she was built from Kaludah's plans. In subsequent years, reports described closer links between Kaludah and Kamiri. A 1919 report on the Royal Commission into Sydney ferries stated that the burnt out Kaludah was rebuilt and renamed Kamiri, while Graeme Andrews (1994) recounts a story from a shipwright involved in the construction of both Kaludah and Kamiri, whereby the shipwright said he found tools engraved "Kaludah" inside Kamiri's hull.

== See also ==
- List of Sydney Harbour ferries
- Timeline of Sydney Harbour ferries
- Sydney K-class ferries
