= Sydney K-class ferry =

Group of double-ended screw steam ferries

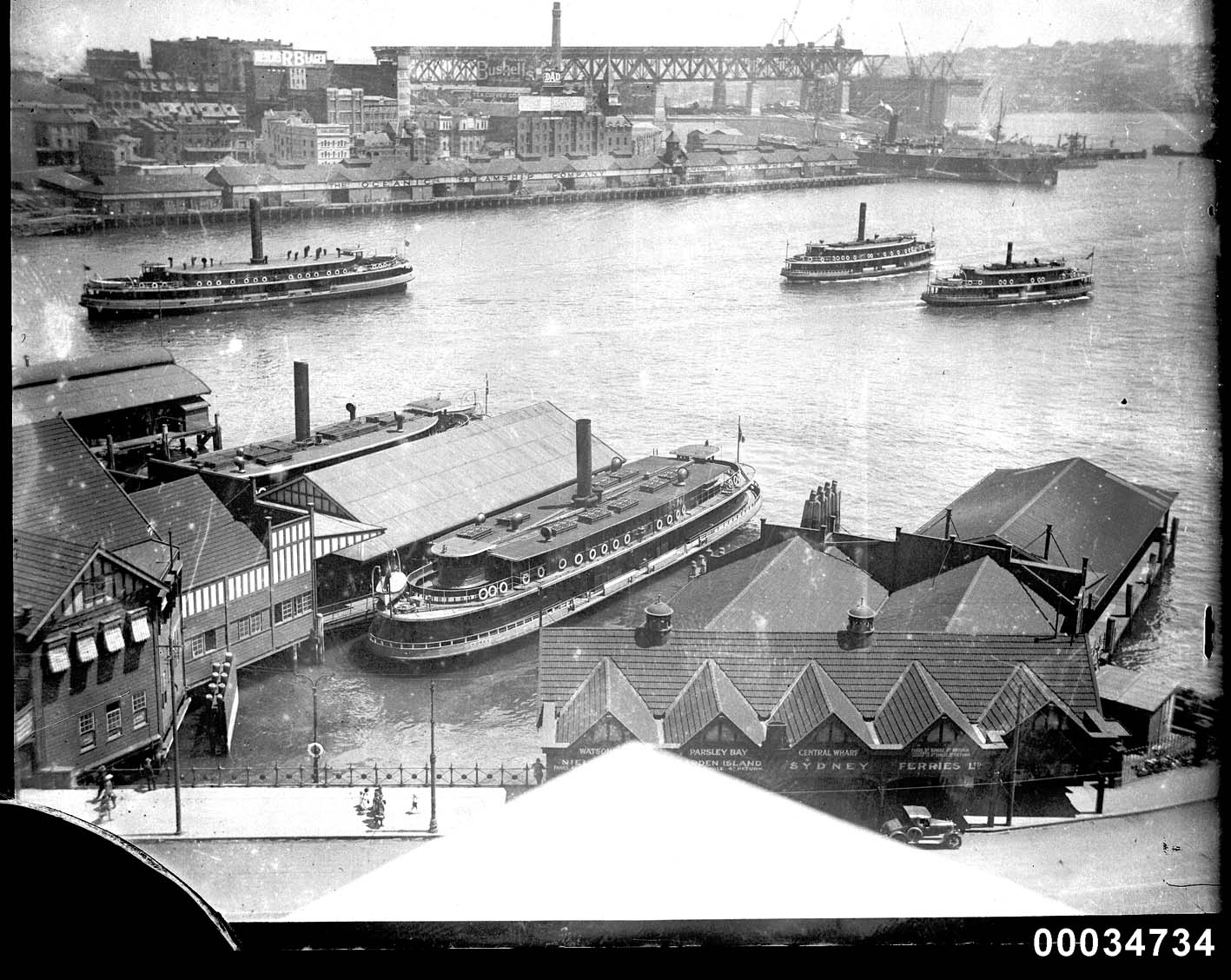
Five K-class ferries at Circular Quay in the 1920s. In the foreground is Koree (1902) and Koompartoo (1922) in the background left

The K-class ferries were a group of double-ended screw steam ferries run by Sydney Ferries Limited and its government successors on Sydney Harbour. The company introduced more than two dozen of the vessels from the 1890s through to the early 20th century to meet the booming demand for ferry services across Sydney Harbour prior to the opening of the Sydney Harbour Bridge in 1932.

The K-names were largely Australian Aboriginal names with their meanings listed in the table below.

== Design ==
The K-class were not a group of identical ferries – they were delivered in batches of two or three identical sister ships – rather they were a general type of vessel that ranged in sized but shared a typical form. They were all double-deck, double-ended screw steamers with two raised wheelhouses and a single tall funnel. Apart from a few early vessels with open upper decks that were later enclosed, the K-class had enclosed upper and lower saloons with lower deck outdoor seating around the vessel, and the upper decks had smaller outdoor areas at either end around the wheelhouses. The boats were all timber-hulled with timber superstructures, except for four later and larger vessels that had steel hulls and timber superstructures – namely, sisters Kanangra and Kirawa (both 1912) and sisters Kuttabul and Koompartoo (both 1922). The boats' upper deck sheer or profile line were curved parallel to the hull sheer, in contrast to many contemporary ferries whose upper deck was built straight fore and aft.

Kareela was the first of Sydney Ferries Limited to have upper decks fully enclosed. The earlier K-class vessels, including Kurraba, Kirribilli, Koree and Kulgoa had only the sides of their upper decks enclosed leaving the ends open, with the roofs being squared off. On Kareela and all subsequent K-class vessels had an upper deck structure with curving roof lines that met at the rear of the wheelhouses thus the upper deck saloon was fully enclosed. Sliding doors gave access to the a small unroofed area surrounding the raised wheelhouses.

== Service history ==
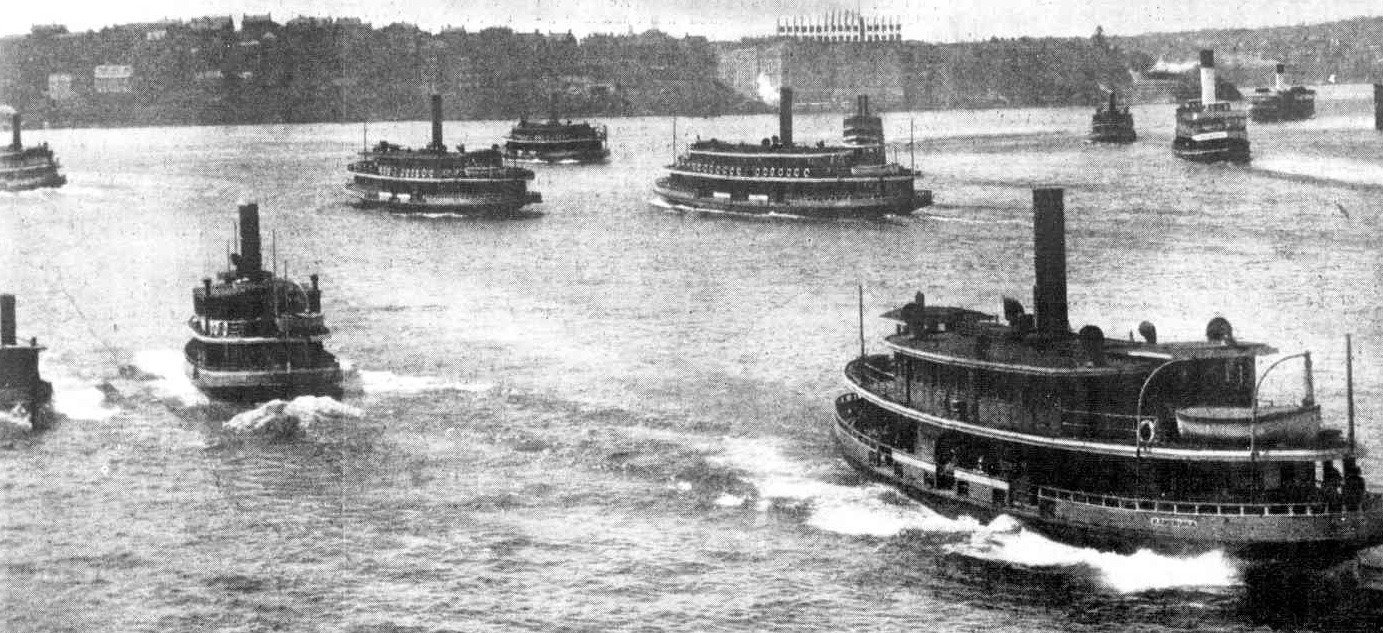
K-class ferries, and two Manly ferries (top right) in Sydney Cove

The ferry trade to the North Shore increased rapidly and consistently from the turn of the century until the opening of the Sydney Harbour Bridge in 1932. The Sydney Ferries fleet became one of the largest in the world - the bulk of which in number and capacity were K-class - and carried 40 million passengers per year by the 1930s. With the opening of the bridge, many of the K-class vessels were deemed redundant and were decommissioned. More still were decommissioned following the NSW State Government takeover of Sydney Ferries in 1951. A handful of the K-class ferries (Karingal, Karrabee, Kanangra, Kameruka) were in service until the mid-1980s having been converted to diesel in the 1930s and 1950s.

During the launch speech for Kaikai in 1906, Sydney Ferries acknowledged they were deliberately naming their vessels with Aboriginal words starting with the letter "K".

== List of K-class vessels ==
Name	Year built	Description	Origin of name	Tons	Length & beam (m)	Passengers	Out of service
Kangaroo (II)	1891	Kangaroo in Neutral Bay Built by David Drake Ltd, Balmain. 60 hp steam engine by Muir & Houston. First double-ended ferry with triple-expansion engines. Was burnt out in 1900 with a rebuild completed in 1901. Worked on North Sydney service before being transferred to Mosman service. Sold for breaking up 1926.	Australian native animal	158 tons	34.1 by 6.6 metres (111 ft 11 in × 21 ft 8 in)	632	1926
Waringa; Karaga	1894	As Waringa (c. 1905–1907) Built by Dunn Brothers, Berry's Bay for North Shore Steam ferries and later taken over by Sydney Ferries Ltd. 30 hp compound steam engine by Muir & Houston Ltd, 11 knots. As built had open deck. In 1913, she was rebuilt by Morrison and Sinclair, and is renamed Karaga, with her original low sides heightened and her superstructure replaced, including a fully glazed upper deck. Taken out of service following opening of Sydney Harbour Bridge. Taken over by Australian government in 1943 for use as accommodation vessel.		125 tons	32.2 by 6.3 metres (105 ft 8 in × 20 ft 8 in)	588	1932(?), 1943 to RAN
Wallaroo; Kiamala	1896	Wallaroo as built Built by Young, Son & Fletcher, Rozelle. Originally built with open upper deck and sister ship to Carabella. 30 hp triple expansion steam engines by Muir & Houston Ltd. Originally operated by North Shore Steam Ferry Company then by Sydney Ferries Ltd. Rebuilt in 1914 by David Drake, Balmain, NSW and glassed-in with named changed to Kiamala. Taken out of service following opening of Sydney Harbour Bridge. Taken over by Australian government in 1943 to assist the war effort as an accommodation vessel. Fate unknown	Wallaroo, Australian native animal.	122 tons	32.4 m (106 ft)	545	1943 to RAN
Carabella; Karabella	1897	Sister to Wallaroo/Kiamala. Built by Young, Son & Fletcher, Rozelle for North Shore Steam Ferry Company (later Sydney Ferries Limited) 30 hp compound steam engine by Muir & Houston Ltd. Received electric lighting 1901. Rebuilt, extended, and renamed Karabella in 1916. On 9 May 1901, collided with Rosedale near Milsons Point and damaged amidships. On 17 January 1902, collided with Sonoma and sponson damaged. Taken out of service following opening of Sydney Harbour Bridge in 1932, however, in 1936 returned to service as an excursion vessel mainly following the 18 footer races. Returned to passenger service in 1939 on Neutral Bay route. Taken over by Australian government in 1943 to assist the war effort.	After a house built on North Shore in 1882-'Carrably'	129 t, 1916: 151 tons	32.0 by 6.6 metres (105 ft 0 in × 21 ft 8 in)	595	1932(?)
Kurraba	1899	Kurraba in Mosman Bay, c. 1909 Similar to Kirribilli (II). Built by North Shore Steam Ferry Co Ltd. Mainly used on the Mosman run. Originally built with open upper deck which was enclosed in 1903. Laid up 1932, sold for breaking up in 1934.	Sydney harbourside suburb	195 tons	40.9 metres (134 ft 2 in)	890	1934
Kirribilli (II)	1900	Similar to Kurraba. Built by John Cuthbert, Sydney. Served various North Shore runs. Retired following opening of the Sydney Harbour Bridge. Broken up 1935.	Australian Aboriginal name meaning 'good fishing spot', and name of a Sydney suburb	198 tons	39.7 m x 7.9m	896	1934
Koree	1902	Koree carrying regatta spectators Built by David Drake, Ltd, Balmain. First Sydney ferry built with enclosed promenade deck passenger house. Sold for breaking up in 1934.	An Australian Aboriginal name for Chowder Bay	276 tons	42.8 m x 8.6 m	1,058	1934
Kummulla	1903	In Mosman Bay Built by Dunn Brothers, North Sydney. Laid up following opening of Sydney Harbour Bridge, 1932. Engine removed 1935 and sold 1935. Hull sold 1939.	An Australian Aboriginal name for "catch me".	168 tons	36.3 m x 7.6 m	795	1934
Kulgoa	1905	Kulgoa (1905) carrying regatta spectator crowds Built by W M Ford Jnr, North Sydney. Along with Kuramia, at 338 tons, the largest wooden ferries on Sydney Harbour. Built to service the busy North Shore routes. In 1935, provided with a higher (flying) bridge for use as a spectator vessel for sailing events. Sold for breaking up 1952 following State Government takeover.	Australian Aboriginal word meaning 'returning'	338 tons	42.7 m x 9.6 m	1,255	1952
Kareela	1905	On Sydney Harbour c. 1930 Built for Neutral Bay to Circular Quay Service by Morrison & Sinclair Ltd, Balmain. Nicknamed 'The Box'. Sold for breaking up in 1959 after Kosciusko returned to service following her conversion to diesel power.	Australian Aboriginal word for 'south wind'	186 tons	34.4 m x 8.2 m	784	1959
Kaikai	1906	Built by David Drake Ltd, Balmain for £13,575. When launched, she was the longest of the Sydney Ferries Ltd fleet and a new pontoon was built at Circular Quay to accommodate her extra length. Survived opening of harbour bridge in 1932 and was modified (1920s?) with a flying bridge to provide her master with greater visibility in order to follow yacht races. She was used extensively for charter and concert events. To Navy 1942 for use as accommodation ship. Navy purchased her in 1943. Sold for breaking up 1947.	Australian Aboriginal word for 'jewfish' or 'food'	303 tons	46.3 x 10.1 m	1,245	1942
Kookooburra	1907	1930s or 1940s Built by Morrison & Sinclair Ltd, Balmain. Represents Sydney Ferries Ltd's first attempt to design ferry specifically for Parramatta River service after it took over the service in 1901. Unusually for K-class, it was originally fitted with a short funnel for service along the river and its low bridges, later fitted with taller funnel. Passengers, however, were showered with soot and awning was placed on promenade deck. Smaller 'sister Kaludah (1909) was a similar design. Kookooburra and Kaludah were the only K-class ferries to have pointed ends. She operated a successful sideline in the 1920s as a harbour excursion vessel. By the early 1940s, she mainly serviced the Quarantine Station at North Head taking people to the city who had been medically cleared for entry. In late 1940s, was sent to Newcastle to carry dockyard workers. Broken up in 1959.	Australian native bird	180 tons	42.7 m x 7.7 m	700	1948-49(?)
Kaludah, formerly Kuranda	1909	Kaludah, 4 March 1911 Designed by Walter Reeks and built by Morrison & Sinclair, Ltd. Balmain. Launched and named as Kuranda on 9 December 1908 by Miss Enid Russell. Built for Sydney Ferry Limited's semi-sea service around Middle Head. Of similar design to Kookooburra with short funnel to pass under low bridges on Parramatta River service. Kookooburra and Kaludah were the only K-class ferries to have pointed ends. Built of hardwood and kauri with bent frames. She had five bulk heads, four of which were iron. Chapman and Co installed the machinery which was imported from Campbell & Calderwood in Scotland. The triple expansion steam engines (50 hp, 12 knots) had cylinders of diameter 12-inch, 20-inch, and 32.5 inch, with stroke length of 18-inches. She had two boilers each 18 feet long and 6 feet 9 inches in diameter with a working pressure of 180 lb. Use of the name Kuranda appears to have been short lived - a July 1909 Sydney Morning Herald article notes "The Kaludah, formerly Kuranda, commenced running in the Parramatta River service in May." Caught fire at her moorings on 22 March 1911, drifted downstream, brought under tow alight by fire boat Pelvius, burnt herself to the water line and sank in Tarban Creek...the shortest lived of the Sydney ferries. Engines and usable timber went to the Kamiri,		137 tons	35.1 x 7.6 m		1911
Kanimbla later Kurra-Ba	1910	Similar to Kosciusko. Built by Morrison & Sinclair Ltd, Balmain. Triple expansion steam engine by Mort's Dock & Engineering Co Ltd, 55 hp, 11 knots. On 15 June 1927, Manly ferry Balgowlah collided with Kanimbla at Circular Quay tearing a hole in the Kanimbla's port bow. Balgowlah had minor damage whereas Kanimbla nearly sank. Four people on Kanimbla were injured during the incident. Gave up her original name, Kanimbla, in 1935 to a bigger ship, and became Kurra-Ba. Broken up 1950s.	Australian Aboriginal word for 'Big fight'	156 tons	35.4 m x 8.8 m	791	1946(?)
Kirrule	1910	Identical sister to Kiandra & Kubu, the three of which were the second largest type of inner harbour vessels and built for the rapidly increasing North Shore demand. Built by Morrison & Sinclair Ltd, Balmain. 70 hp triple expansion steam engine by Mort's Dock Engineering Co Ltd. 13 knots. Along with her sisters, they were given greater power than earlier vessels of the same size so that longer runs to Mosman were quicker. All three vessels survived the opening of the Sydney Harbour Bridge, but Kirrule and Kiandra were laid up following State Government takeover of Sydney Ferries Ltd in 1951. She was considered for conversion to diesel, however, she was broken up in 1953.	Australian Aboriginal word for 'aroused'	258 tons	42.7 m x 9.2 m	1,080	1951
Kiandra	1911	Built by Morrison & Sinclair Ltd, Balmain. 70 hp triple expansion steam engine by Mort's Dock & Engineering Co, Ltd. 13 knots. Identical sister to Kirrule & Kubu, the three of which were the second largest type of inner harbour vessels and built for the rapidly increasing North Shore demand. Along with her sisters, she was given greater power than earlier vessels of the same size so that longer runs to Mosman were quicker. Collided with Manly ferry Curl Curl on the 30 April 1930. The steel-built Curl Curl suffered no damage, whereas timber Kiandra was severely damaged to her sponson along one side. During the 1920s, Kiandra and her two sisters were used for harbour cruises and proved popular in this role. Laid up immediately following State Government takeover of Sydney Ferries Ltd in 1951. Sold for breaking up 1953	a corruption of Aboriginal 'Gianderra' for 'sharp stones for knives' and town in NSW	258 tons	42.7 m x 9.2 m	1,101	1951
Kosciusko	1911	As a steamer, pre-1932 Similar to Kanimbla. Built by David Drake Ltd., Balmain. 54 hp triple expansion steam engine by Campbell & Calderwell. 10 knots. Early in her service life, Kosciusko was rammed by a steel fuel barge under tow causing severe damage. She didn't sink only because the barge could not be easily removed and was sealing the hole in her hull. In August 1937, she collided head on with ferry Kiamala causing significant damage to both vessels. Converted to diesel in 1959 (60 hp Crossley Brothers, 11 knots), allowing coal-fired Kareela to be retired. When first commissioned, she was a medium size ferry in comparison to the rest of the Sydney Ferries fleet, however, by 1975, she was the second largest. In 1975, towed to Hobart following collapse of bridge and sold to that city. Following re-opening of the bridge, she was sold and used as a floating restaurant, but burnt out during renovations in 1982. End of hull including propeller and rudder displayed outside hotel in Hobart.	Australian mountain named after Polish military leader Tadeusz Kościuszko	165 tons	35.4 m x 8.7 m	785	1975
Kanangra	1912	Sister ship to Kirawa who were the only steel-hull K Class vessels. Built by Mort's Dock & Engineering Co. Ltd, Balmain. 68 hp triple expansion steam engine (by builder). 13 knots. The last of the inner-harbour ferries to be converted to diesel (8-cylinder diesel, 44 hp, 11 knots) re-entering service in 1959. Retired 1985. Now part of Sydney Heritage Fleet and under restoration. One of the longest serving Sydney ferries and the last of the large early twentieth century Sydney ferries.	Australian Aboriginal word for 'beautiful view'	295 tons	45.5 m x 9.7 m	945	1985
Kirawa	1912	Sister ship to Kanangra who were the first steel-hull K Class vessels (then only Kuttabul and Koompartoo had steel hulls). Built by Mort's Dock & Engineering Co Ltd, Balmain. 68 hp triple expansion steam engines by builder. 13 knots. Retired and broken up in 1953 due to faulty boiler tubes.	Australian Aboriginal word for 'looking for them'	295 tons	45.5 m x 9.7 m	1,070	1953
Kubu	1912	Identical sister to Kiandra & Kirrule the three of which were the second largest type of inner harbour vessels and built for the rapidly increasing North Shore demand. Built by Morrison & Sinclair Ltd, Balmain. 68 hp triple expansion steam engine by Mort's Dock & Engineering Co Ltd. 12 knots. Along with her sisters, she was given greater power than earlier vessels of the same size so that longer runs to Mosman were quicker. Used in the 1920s as an excursion vessel. Removed from service following Kanangra's return to service after conversion to diesel. The last coal-fired steam ferry on Port Jackson. Laid up in 1960.	Australian Aboriginal word for 'oak tree'	258 tons	42.7 m x 9.2 m	1,072	1959
Kamiri	1912	In Mosman Bay, 1946 Sister to Kameruka. Built by Morrison & Sinclair Ltd, Balmain. Used engines and timbers of Kaludah which was gutted by fire in 1912. 50 hp triple expansion steam engines by Campbell and Calderwood. 11 knots. Retired in 1951 and broken up upon state government takeover of Sydney Ferries Ltd.	Name of Aboriginal Australian tribe	144 tons	34.1 m x 7.9 m	594	1951
Kameruka	1913	As a steamer, likely 1930s or 1940s Sister to Kamiri. Built by Morrison & Sinclair Ltd, Balmain for Parramatta River run. Relatively high speed ferry, and thus used on Taronga Zoo and river runs. 53 hp triple expansion steam engines by Campbell and Calderwood. 12 knots. Burnt out in 1918 and rebuilt. 1938 boiler crowns collapsed and was not returned to work until 1945. In 1954 was converted to diesel (60 hp Crossley Brothers 6-cylinder, 11 knots) and given a more modern looking makeover. One of the longest-lived Sydney Harbour ferries.	Australian Aboriginal word meaning 'wait til I come'	144 tons	34.1 m x 7.9 m	594	1984
Karrabee	1913	As built as a steamer Sister to Karingal. Built by Morrison & Sinclair Ltd. Original triple expansion steam engines (36 hp, Hawthorn, Leslie & Co.) were sourced from Pheasant (1887), Sydney's first triple-expansion steam ferry. These engines are now part of the Museum of Applied Arts and Sciences collection. 1936 converted from steam to diesel-electric power (6-cylinder diesel, by Henty & Gardner), the first of the Sydney Ferries Ltd fleet converted. Re-engined 1958, 6-cylinder diesel, 450 bhp, Crossley Brothers. Used in 1966, along with Karingal, on a weekend and holiday service to Watsons Bay, however, the service ceased due to lack of passengers. 1984 sank at Circular Quay after competing in the annual Great Ferry Race. Raised two days later and laid up. 1986 sold and relocated to Gosford as floating restaurant. Sank at wharf in 2003 and broken up in 2005.	Australian Aboriginal word for 'Cockatoo'	107 tons	32.8 m	653	1984
Karingal	1913	As a steamer Sister to Karrabee. Built by Morrison & Sinclair Ltd., Balmain. Her original steam engines (28 hp Bow, McLachlan & Co) came from Alathea when she was converted to a lighter. Karingal could make 11 knots with her original steam engines. Converted to diesel in 1937 (6-cylinder L. Gardner, 9 knots). Re-engined 1961 (450 bhp 6-cylinder diesel, Crossley Brothers). Used in 1966, along with Karrabee, on a weekend and holiday service to Watsons Bay, however, the service ceased due to lack of passengers. Sank in Bass Strait en route to new owners in Melbourne in 1980s.	Australian Aboriginal word meaning 'happy home'	107 tons	31.7 m	608	1984(?)
Kuramia	1914	Along with Kulgoa, at 335 tons, the largest wooden ferries on Sydney Harbour. Built by David Drake Ltd, Balmain. 69 hp triple expansion steam engines by Mort's Dock & Engineering Co. Ltd. 12 knots. Engine sold 1940, requisitioned for naval use in 1942 as a boom gate vessel on the harbour boom off Watsons Bay. Hulk sunk as target of Sydney, 10 October 1953.		335 tons	47.7 m	1,357	
Kuttabul	1922	Along with her sister, Koompartoo, she was the last of the K-class ferries and was one of the two biggest ferries owned by Sydney Ferries. Built by NSW Government Dockyard, Newcastle. 113 hp triple expansion steam engine by builder. 12 knots. With the largest passenger capacity of any Sydney ferry including Manly ferries, both vessels built for the short heavy lift run from Circular Quay to Milsons Point. Originally certified for 1,505 passengers, they later carried up to 2,500 passengers, and regularly 2,000. Removed from service following opening of the Sydney Harbour Bridge. Due to their large size and relatively young age, other uses were found for them including cruises and to view harbour sailing events. Taken over by the Royal Australian Navy as an accommodation ship and moored on eastern shore of Garden Island. On 31 May 1942, sunk by Japanese torpedo with the loss of nineteen naval ratings (see Attack on Sydney Harbour). Naval base at Garden Island carries the name HMAS Kuttabul	Australian Aboriginal word for 'wonderful'	447 tons	55.7 m x 11.0 m	2,089	1932
Koompartoo	1922	Built by NSW Government Dockyard, Newcastle. 113 hp triple expansion steam engine by builder. 12 knots. Along with sister Kuttabul, was one of the two biggest ferries owned by Sydney Ferries and the largest ferry on Sydney Harbour by passenger capacity. Both vessels built for the short heavy lift run from Circular Quay to Milsons Point. Made redundant on the Milsons Point run following 1932 opening of the Sydney Harbour Bridge and converted to concert boat in 1935. Converted to Naval boom-gate vessel 1942-42. Sold to Commonwealth Government 1945. Stripped hull went to Tasmania 1966 to be used as a bauxite barge.	Australian Aboriginal word meaning 'a fresh start'	447 tons	55.7 m x 11.0	2,089	1932(?)

== See also ==
- List of Sydney Harbour ferries
- Timeline of Sydney Harbour ferries
