= Koree =

Australian ferry

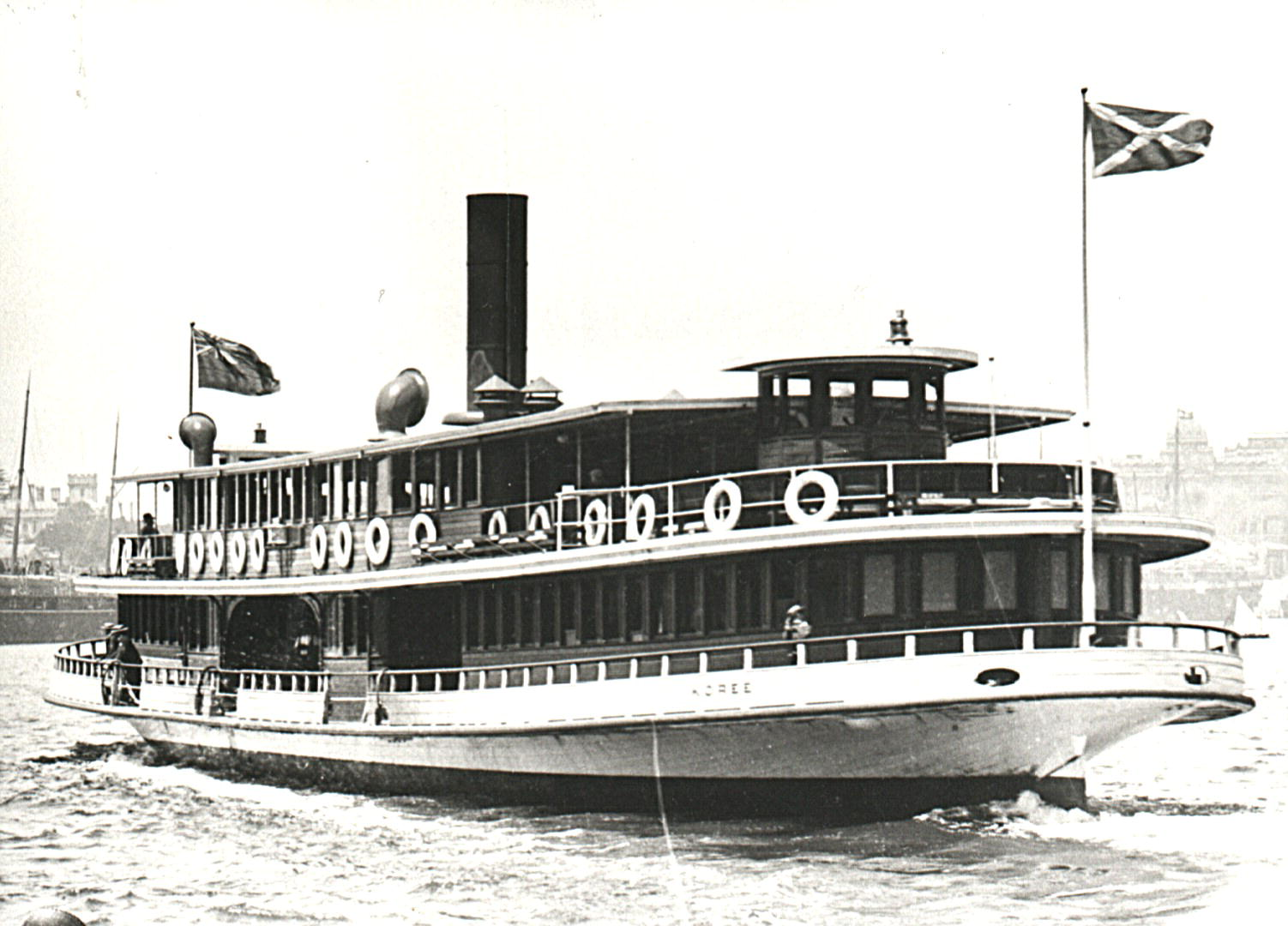
- Koree in her original appearance

History
- Name: Koree
- Namesake: Indigenous word for Chowder Bay
- Operator: Sydney Ferries Limited
- Builder: David Drake, Balmain
- Launched: 1902
- Fate: Sold for breaking up, 1934

General characteristics
- Tonnage: 276 tons
- Length: 42.8 m
- Beam: 8.6 m
- Installed power: 69 hp triple expansion steam
- Propulsion: double-ended screw
- Speed: 11 knots
- Capacity: 1,058

Koree was a "K-class" ferry on Sydney Harbour. Launched in 1902, the timber-hulled steamer was built for Sydney Ferries Limited during the boom in cross-harbour ferry travel prior to the opening of the Sydney Harbour Bridge.

When built, Koree was Sydney's largest cross-harbour ferry and a typical early example of the "K-class"; a group of double-deck, double-ended, steam-powered screw ferries. Koree was the first Sydney ferry built with the sides of her promenade (upper) deck enclosed, although the ends near the wheelhouses remained open.

Built for, and initially used on, the short but busy cross-harbour route between Circular Quay and Milsons Point, Koree was also used frequently on the Mosman route. Along with 17 other Sydney Ferries Limited vessels, the ferry was sold for breaking up in 1934 following the opening of the Sydney Harbour Bridge in 1932.

== Background ==
Koree was built for Sydney Ferries Limited during the early twentieth century boom in cross-Harbour travel prior to the 1932 opening of the Sydney Harbour Bridge. At the time, the company ran one of the largest ferry fleets in the world.

Koree was an earlier vessel of a broader type of timber double-ended screw ferry known as the K-class. The company built 25 of vessels between the 1890s and early 1920s to meet the booming demand. The K-class were all propelled by triple expansion steam engines and were predominantly timber-hulled (four later K-class had steel hulls).

Koree followed Sydney Ferries Limited's then emerging tradition of naming their vessels after Australian Aboriginal words starting with "K". "Koree" is thought to be an indigenous name for Chowder Bay.

== Design and construction ==
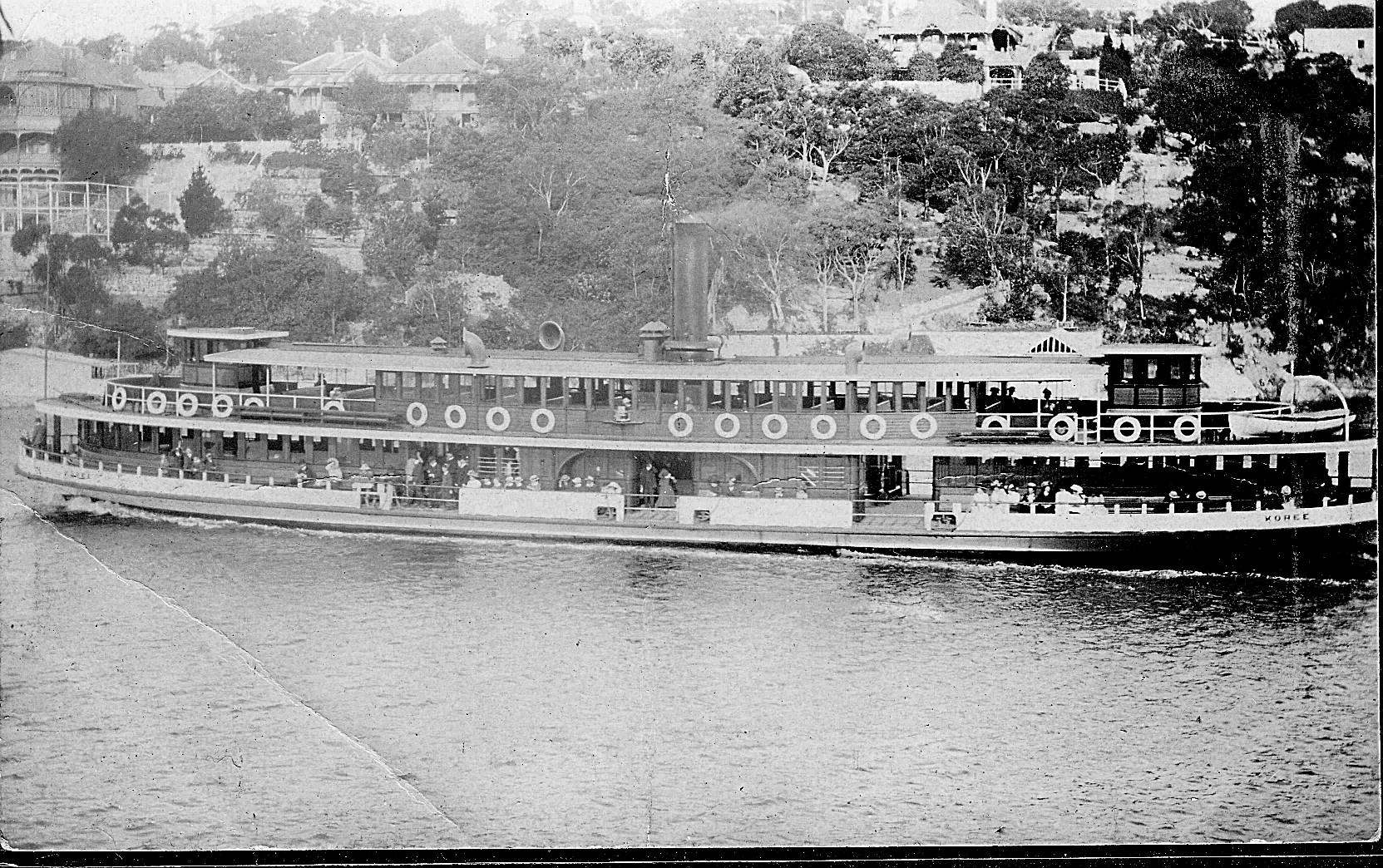
In Mosman Bay, circa 1910. Koree was the first Sydney Harbour ferry to be built with enclosed upper decks

Plans for the hull were provided by Mr Scott, from the plans of the late Captain T Sumberbell, manager of Sydney Ferries Limited with the design being an evolution of the company's recent Kurraba and Kirribilli ferries. Koree was built by David Drake at Bald Rock in Balmain. Her machinery was provided by Clyde Engineering to a specification provided by Sydney Ferries Limited's works manager, Mr T Brown. Her 480 hp triple expansion steam inverted direct-acting and surface condensing engines comprised 13, 21 and 34 inches respectively with a 21 inch stroke. She had two multi tubular cylindrical boilers of 7 and 2 inch diameter of 18 feet in length. The boilers' working pressure was 170 lb. Koree's patent suspension furnaces had a heating surface of 1600 square feet.

Koree's hull was launched on 23 July 1902 and christened by Miss O'Sullivan, the daughter of the Minister for Works. A bottle of port was smashed on her rudder.

At 276 tons, she was, by a significant margin, the company's largest vessel when built. The previous largest, sisters Kurraba and Kirribilli, were 195 and 198 tons, respectively. Koree was rated to carry 1,058 passengers compared to Kurraba at 890 and Kirribilli at 896. Koree was 42.8 m long with a beam of 8.6 m. The keel and kelson were of ironbark, with the frames of blue and spotted gum. Planking to the waterline were of blue and spotted gum and planking above the waterline was of kauri. Four side companions were provided instead of the usual two between the two passenger decks to service the increased capacity.

Koree was the first ferry on Sydney Harbour to be built with closed in upper decks with sash windows provided for most of the deck's length. Kurraba's (1899) and Kirribilli's (1900) open decks were enclosed in 1903 all subsequent K-class ferries were built with sash-windowed upper decks. The first Manly ferries to have enclosed upper decks were the sisters, Dee Why and Curl Curl, both of 1928. Koree was fitted with electric lighting, at the time a relatively new feature for Sydney Ferries, with the 93-light system supplied by Westinghouse. Communication between the wheelhouses and the engine room was by Chadburn telegraph fitted with turn rods and bevelled brass. With the continuing rapid expansion of the Sydney Ferries Limited fleet, by 1912, there were another fifteen vessels in the passenger fleet.

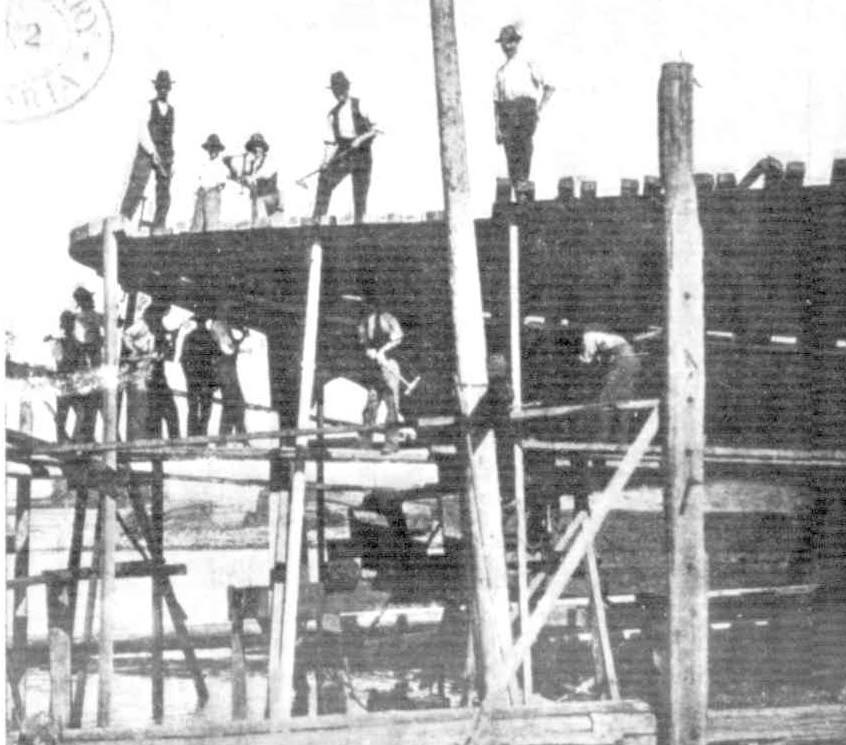
Workers building Koree at the David Drake yard in Balmain

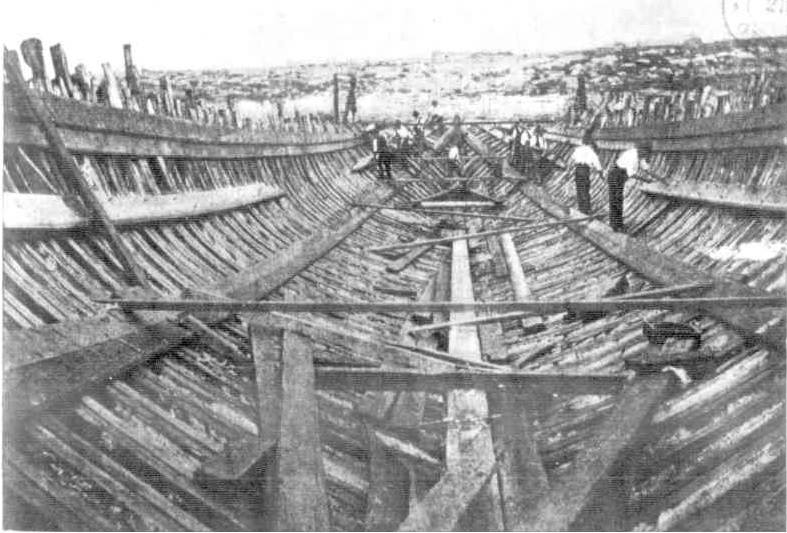
The timber hull takes shape at the David Drake yard in Balmain

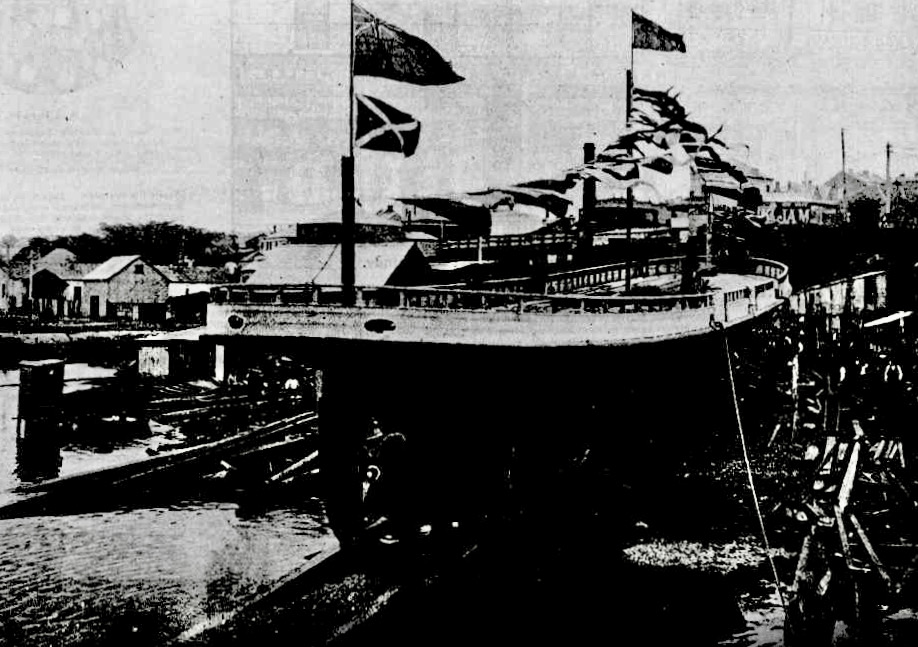
Launch day, David Drake yard, Balmain, 23 July 1902

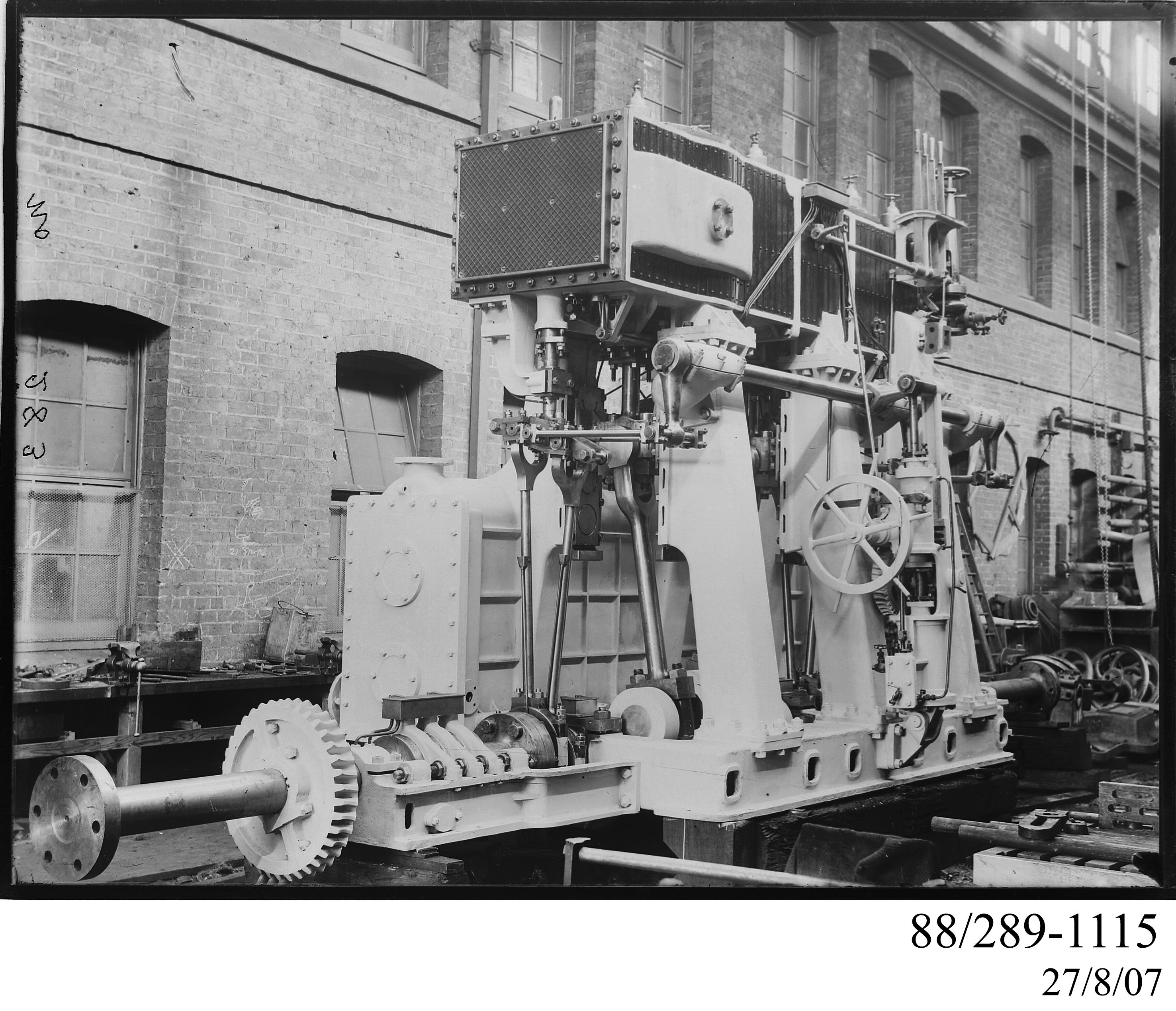
Triple expansion steam engine for Koree at Clyde Engineering yard

== Service history ==
Koree's trials were held on 27 November 1902 during which she reached a speed of close to 11 knots over the measured mile. Sydney Ferries Limited representatives and guests were on board. Later moored at Berrys Bay for speeches following the trials, the chairman noted that it was the company's largest and most advance vessel, and the "best boat of her kind in the world".

The largest ferry in the fleet when introduced, Koree was initially used predominantly on the busy cross harbour routes to Milsons Point. She was joined on the route by Kulgoa in 1904. With the introduction of the larger Kaikai in 1907, Koree was transferred to other routes, including McMahon's Point / Lavender Bay and the Mosman service.

On 19 March 1932, the Sydney Harbour Bridge was open. Sydney Ferries Limited patronage fell from 40 million annually to 15 million. The Milsons Point service, which crossed the harbour at the location of the new bridge, was quickly redundant. 17 vessels from the fleet were retired from service, including Koree, other large and older K-class ferries Kurraba and Kirribilli, and all Sydney Ferries Ltd's vehicular ferries. Koree was sold for breaking up in 1934 for £100.

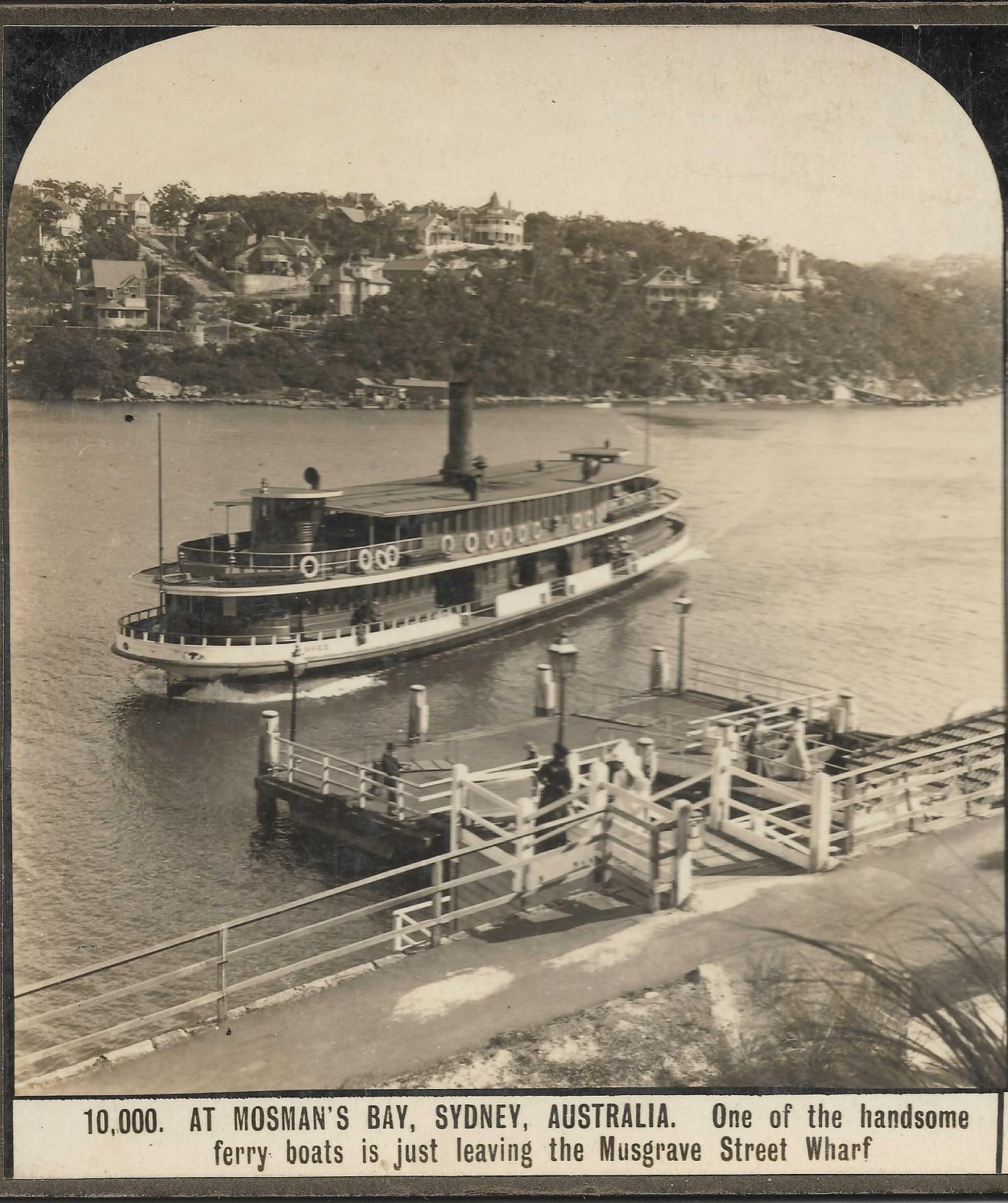
Approaching Musgrave Street Wharf circa 1912

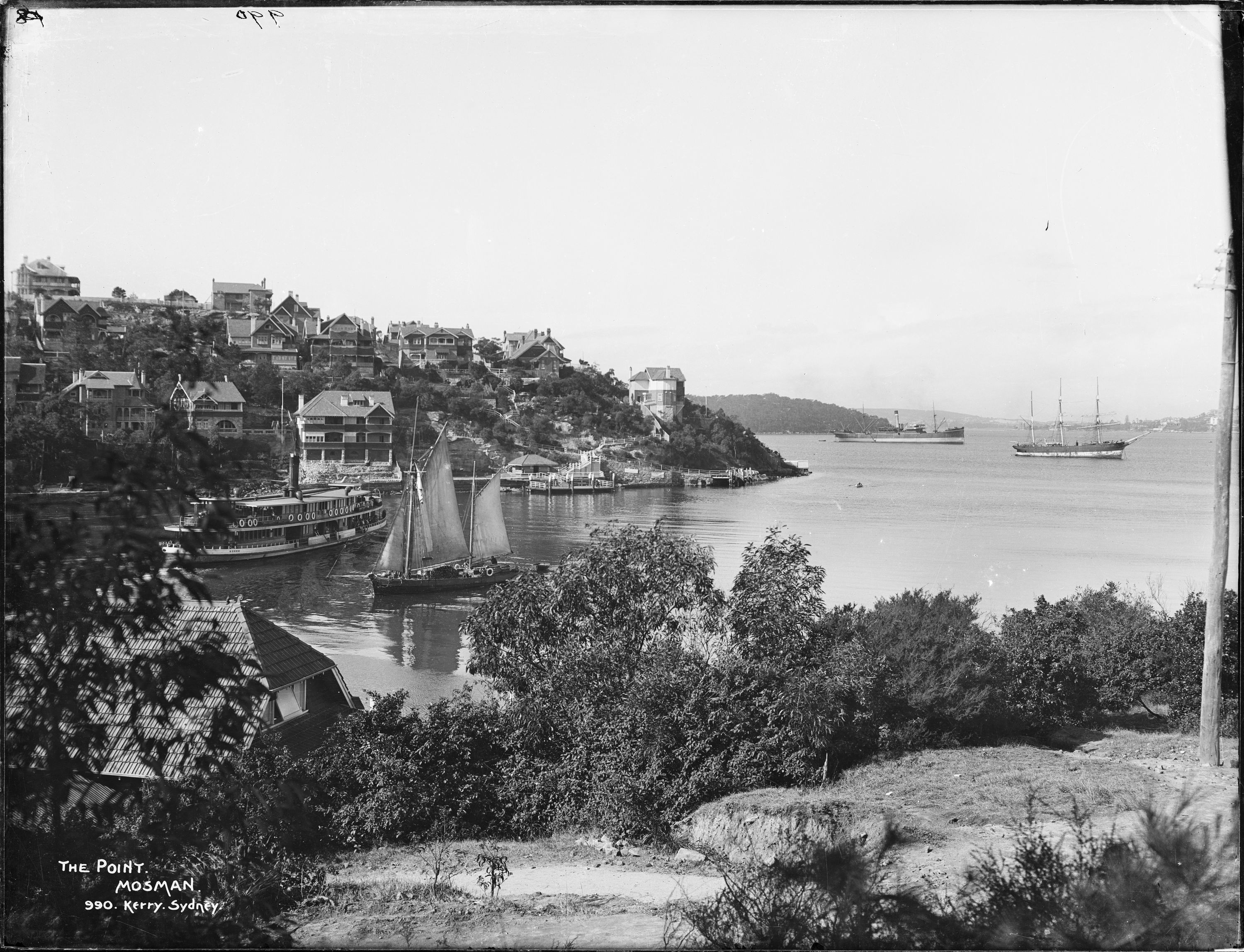
In Mosman Bay

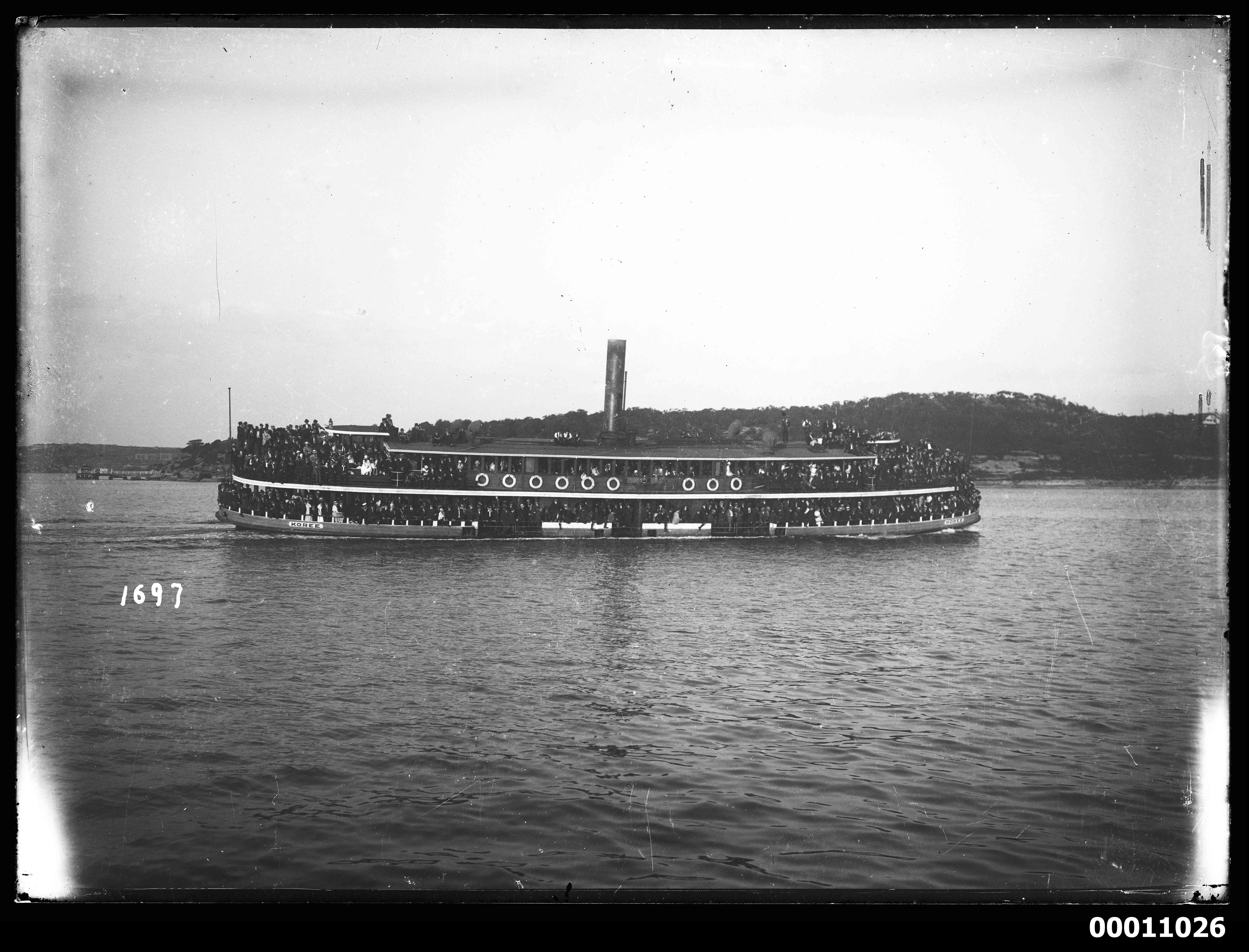
Koree following the yacht races

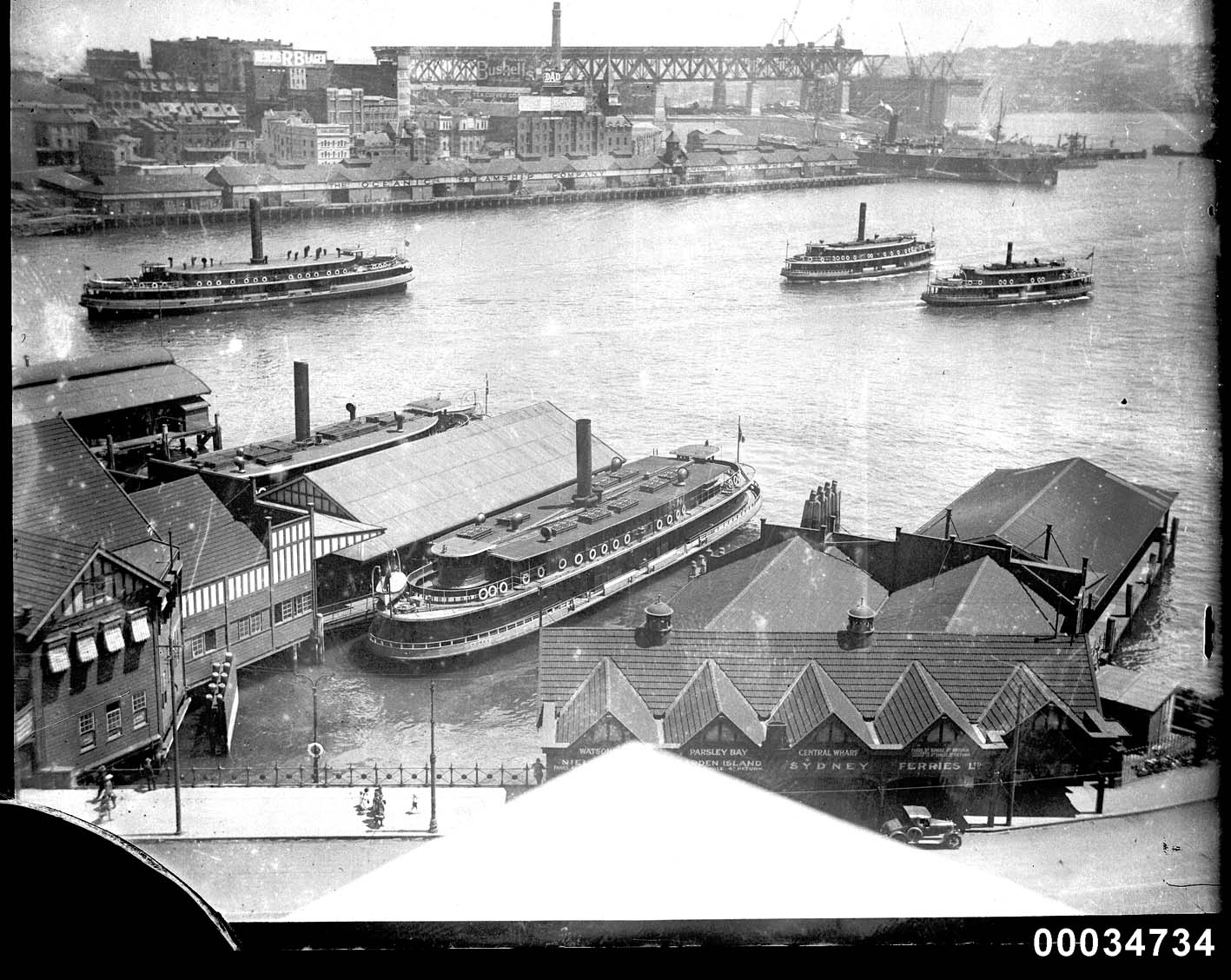
Koree, foreground, at Circular Quay with other K-class ferries with the Sydney Harbour Bridge under construction behind, during Sydney Ferries Limited's 1920s peak

== Incidents ==
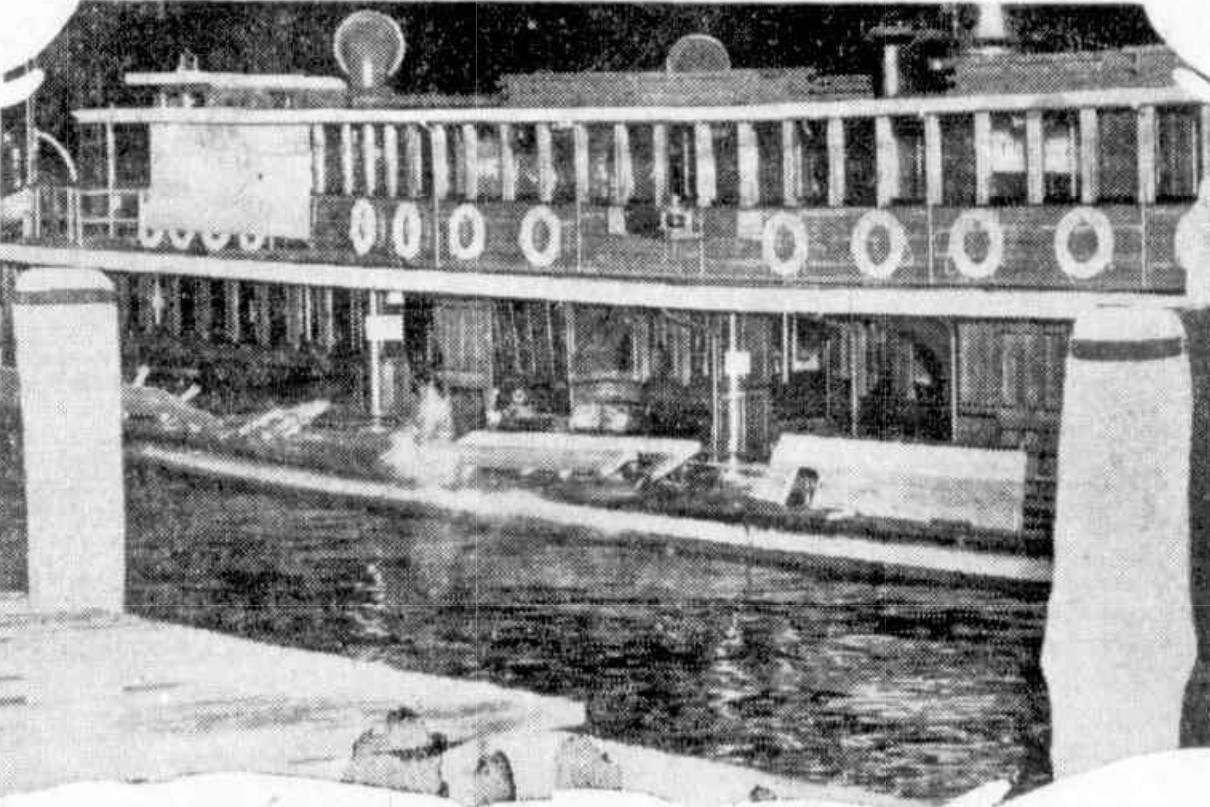
Koree with ripped out bulwarks after collision with Kuramia, 21 September 1929

- 1 January 1903 - after leaving Circular Quay on a Milsons Point trip, a young woman, Maud White, jumped from the ferry. The master, Edward Bridge, and two hands, Henry Punch and James McCleer, jumped into the water and rescued the woman. Koree returned immediately to Circular Quay, whereupon White was taken to Sydney Hospital.
- 29 August 1905 - After leaving Milsons Point at 5:15am, Koree collides with tug, Champion, on her way to Circular Quay. Koree suffered significant damage, and a subsequent Marine Court enquiry found the ferry's skipper at fault.
- 24 December 1910 - Koree, on a Mosman to Circular Quay run, had a minor collision with Manly ferry, Bellubera, which was steaming from the Port Jackson Steamship Company base at Kurraba Point. Both vessels had taken evasive action and the collision was a scrape that damaged Koree's front rail.
- 21 June 1912 - Koree collided with Kirribilli off McMahon's Point, with Kirribilli suffering considerable damage.
- 9 October 1918 - Koree struck Milsons Point pontoon hard after being stuck in a strong ebb tide. Her bow was badly damaged ripping out bulwarks and part of her sponson. With damage confined to above the waterline, she made another two trips before being laid up at the Sydney Ferries Limited yard in Milsons Point for repairs.
- 28 May 1925 - Kirawa (travelling from Circular Quay to Mosman) collided head-on with Koree (travelling from Mosman to Circular Quay) off Cremorne Point with both vessels sustaining damage.
- May 1925 - Koree collided with Kirawa off Cremorne.
- 21 September 1929 - Koree collided with Kuramia. The former suffered £40 damage whereas the latter was undamaged.

== See also ==
- List of Sydney Harbour ferries
- Timeline of Sydney Harbour ferries
- Sydney K-class ferries
