= Kirawa =

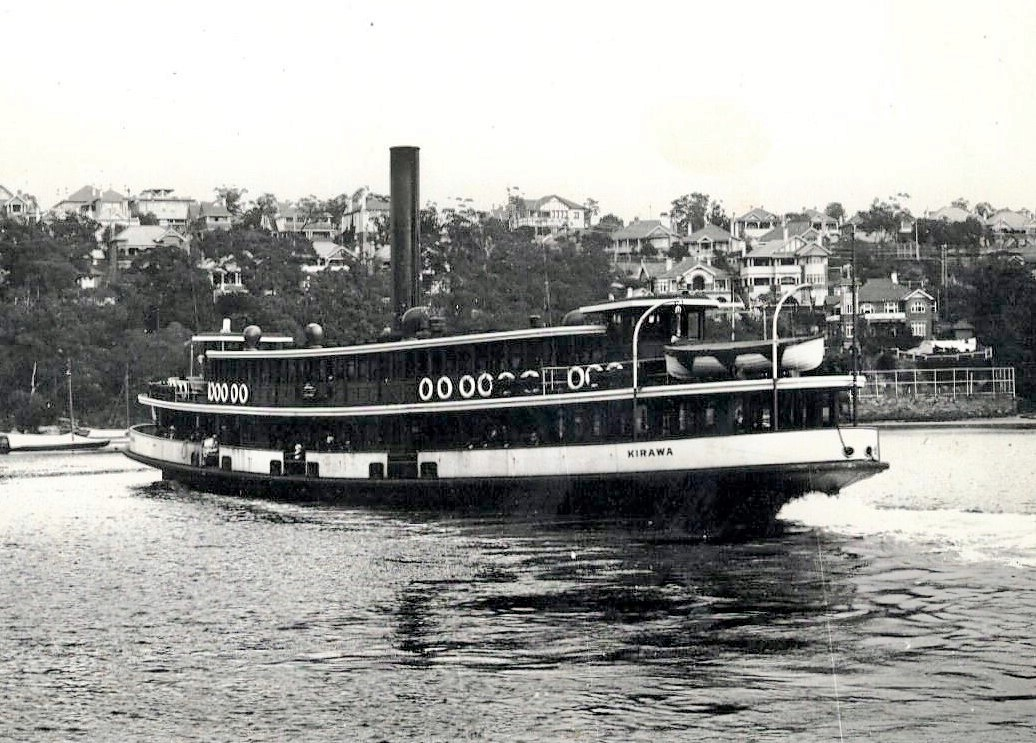
- Kirawa in Mosman Bay, circa 1915

History
- Name: Kirawa
- Operator: Sydney Ferries Limited
- Port of registry: Sydney
- Builder: Mort's Dock
- Cost: £17,873
- Launched: 2 July 1912
- Out of service: 1953
- Identification: Official number 131534,
- Fate: Broken up

General characteristics
- Tonnage: 295 tonnes
- Length: 45.7 m
- Beam: 9.7 m
- Decks: 2
- Propulsion: triple-expansion steam
- Capacity: 945

Kirawa was a ferry on Sydney Harbour. She was a near identical sister vessel with Kanangra, both of which were launched by Sydney Ferries Limited in 1912 during the ferry boom years before Sydney Harbour Bridge was constructed.

They were the first of four steel-hulled "K-class" ferries (the majority of the type were timber-hulled). At 45 metres in length and with passenger capacity of almost 1,000, and they were among the largest of the Sydney Ferries Ltd fleet. At launch, the press noted Kirawa was built for service to Cremorne, which they ran in addition to a route to Mosman.

Kirawa was decommissioned in 1953. Kanangra was in passenger service until 1985 and is now part of the Sydney Heritage Fleet and is moored at Rozelle Bay undergoing restoration. Sydney Ferries Limited generally choose Australian Aboriginal names for the early 20th century "K-class" steamers. "Kirawa" is thought to mean "looking for them".

== Background ==
Kirawa was built for Sydney Ferries Limited during the early 20th century ferry boom in Sydney Harbour prior to the 1932 opening of the Sydney Harbour Bridge. At the time, the company ran one of the largest ferry fleets in the world. Both her and sister Kanangra were part of broader type of around 25 double-ended timber screw ferries—the Sydney K-class ferries—that the company commissioned between the 1890s and early 1920s to meet the booming demand.

The two ferries followed the Sydney Ferries Limited convention of naming their vessels after Australian Aboriginal words starting with "K". "Kirawa" is thought to me "looking for you".

== Design and construction ==
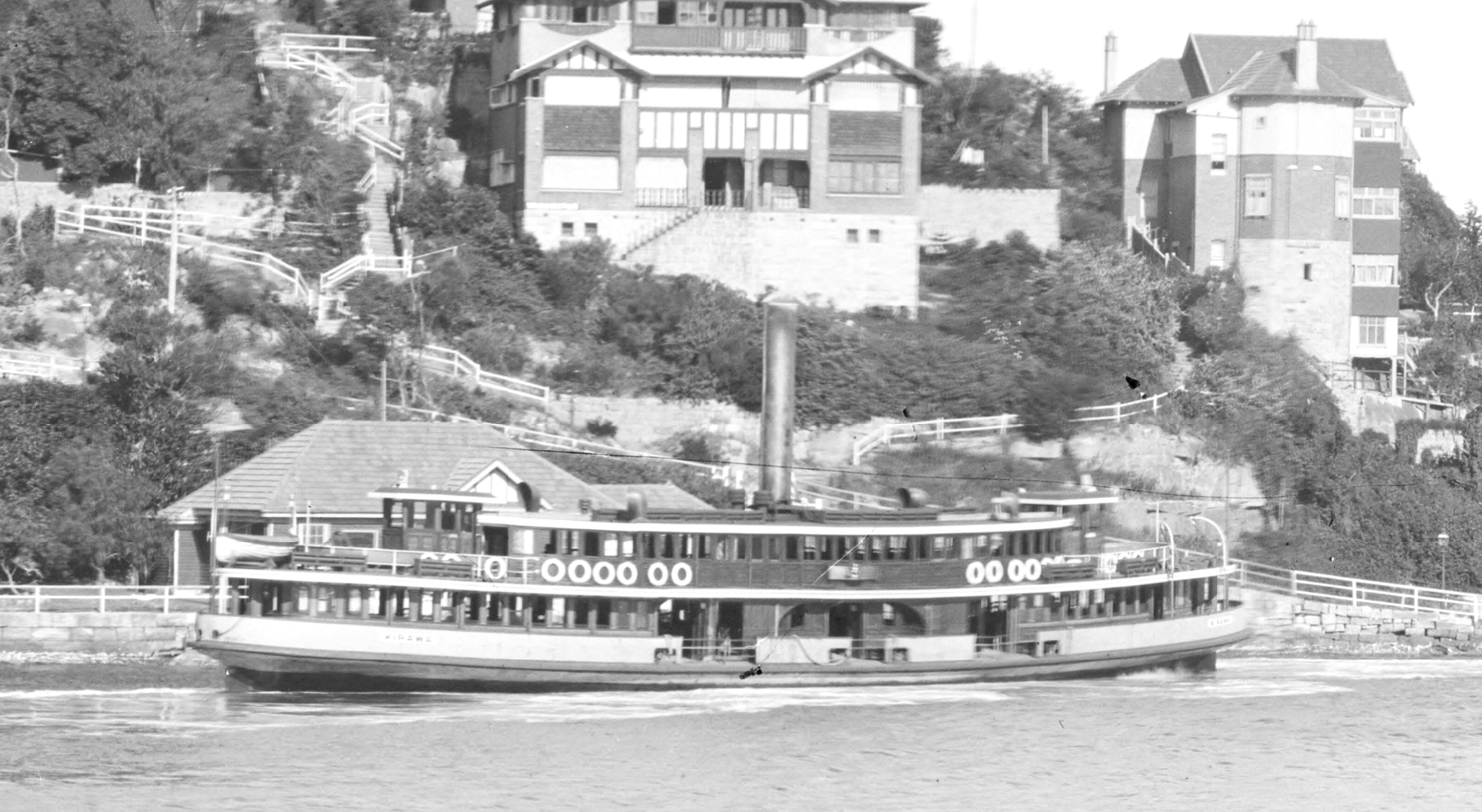
A relatively new Kirawa at Musgrave Street (South Mosman) wharf, 1917

As with all the K-class and Manly ferries built at the time, she was double ended ferries with wheelhouses, propellers and rudders at both ends. Unlike the previous K-class ferries that were timber-hulled, Kirawa (and Kanangra) were riveted steel hull vessels, although like the rest of the K-class, their decks and superstructures were timber. Both ferries had five watertight bulkheads. The two were built by Mort's Dock at their Woolwich yard for Sydney Ferries Limited for a cost of £17,873 each.

She had triple expansion coal-fired steam engines, with cylinders of 14-inch, 22 1/2-inch, and 37-inch diameters respectively and a stroke of 21 inches. Steam was supplied by two navy type boilers, fitted with corrugated furnaces, and having a working pressure of I80 lb. The auxiliaries included an independent centrifugal circulating pump, automatic feed pump, feed heater, and filter, etc. The engines produced 68 hp and pushed her to 13 knots.

== Service history ==
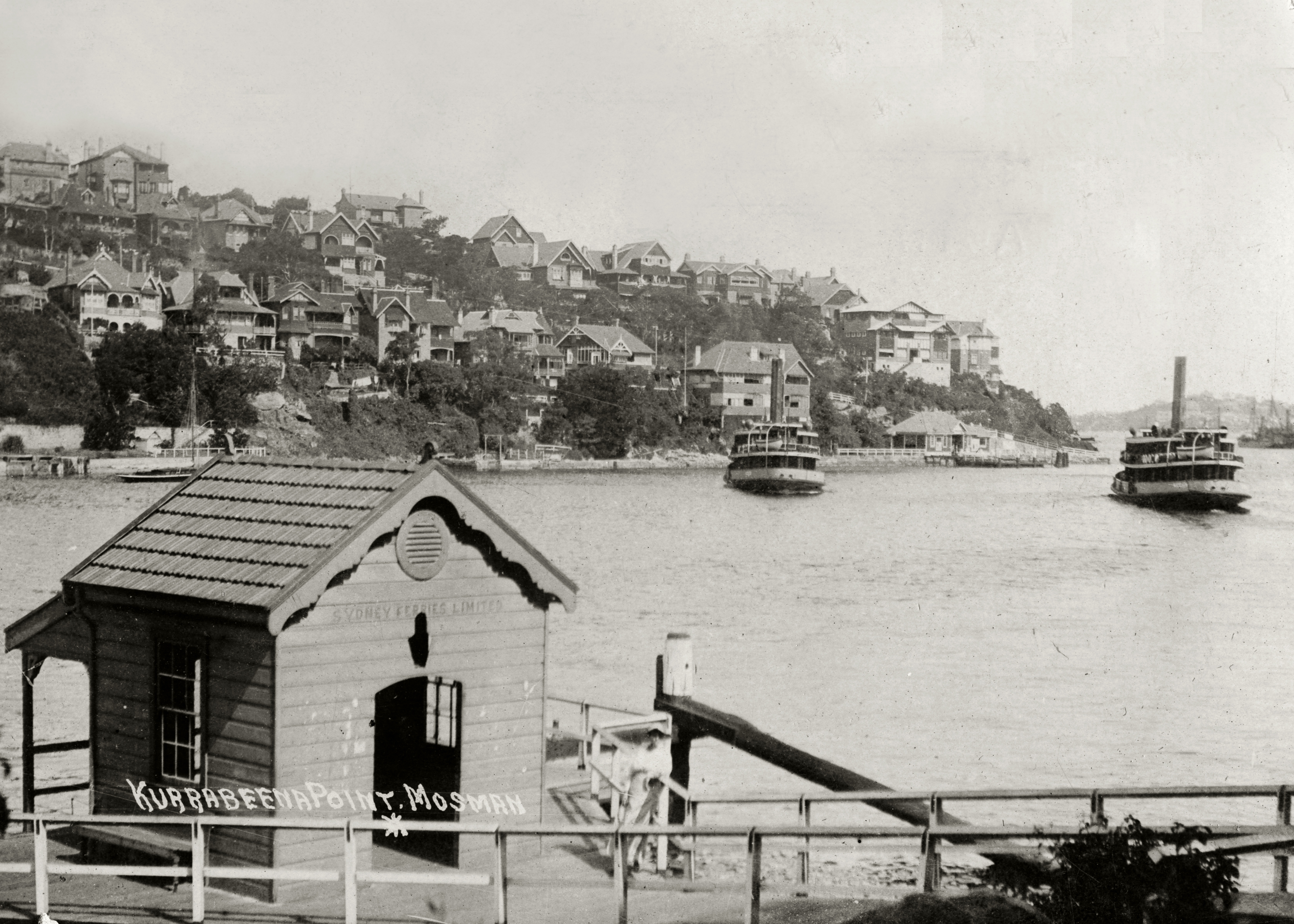
Kirawa and Kanangra in Mosman Bay, ca. 1920s or early 1930s

Kirawa was launched on 2 July 1912 and christened by Miss Goddard, daughter of W C Goddard, director of Sydney Ferries Limited. Her official trials were held on 29 October where she averaged 13 knots.

Kirawa, Kanangra, and the three similarly sized "Kirrule-type" ferries were built for the booming Cremorne and Mosman routes, with each vessel having an approximate capacity of 1,000 passengers. Demand for ferry services across the harbour was booming in the early 20th century, and in 1911, Sydney Ferries Limited had begun services to the Cremorne wharf with a tram connection.

Following the 1932 opening of the Sydney Harbour Bridge, Kirawa was kept in service, while 18 (mostly older) ferries were decommissioned due to the drop in demand. Prior to the bridge opening, Sydney Ferries Limited had transported 40 million passengers per year, which dropped to 15 million after the bridge opening. The drop in demand for the remaining ferry fleet was somewhat mitigated as many could not afford their own transport in the Great Depression of the 1930s and rationing of fuel during World War 2 made the coal required for the steam ferries relatively cheap.

In 1951, as the demand for ferry services dropped further to 9 million following the end of the war, the New South Wales state government took over Sydney Ferries Limited and its remaining fleet and assets. The Port Jackson and Manly Steamship Company, which ran the Manly service, was paid to run the services. The services and fleet were quickly rationalised with most of the larger remaining timber K-class steamers being decommissioned. Some smaller coal burners were converted to diesel (including Kameruka and Kosciusko). In December 1952, Kirawa was reported as running a showboat excursion.

In 1953 Kirawa was laid up in need of a new boiler. As there was no longer need for two large ferries, she was sold to be broken up. Hulked, she was renamed Demolisher and, along with the stripped-down Manly ferry Balgowlah, was used in the demolition and removal of the old Iron Cove Bridge.

Kanangra was converted to diesel power in 1959, and her tall smoke stack was replaced with a smaller exhaust funnel, and the boilers became the fuel tanks. One of the longest serving ferries on Sydney Harbour, Kanangra was withdrawn from service in 1985 and moored adjacent to the Pyrmont Bridge in Darling Harbour. As of 2020, she is moored in Rozelle Bay under restoration.

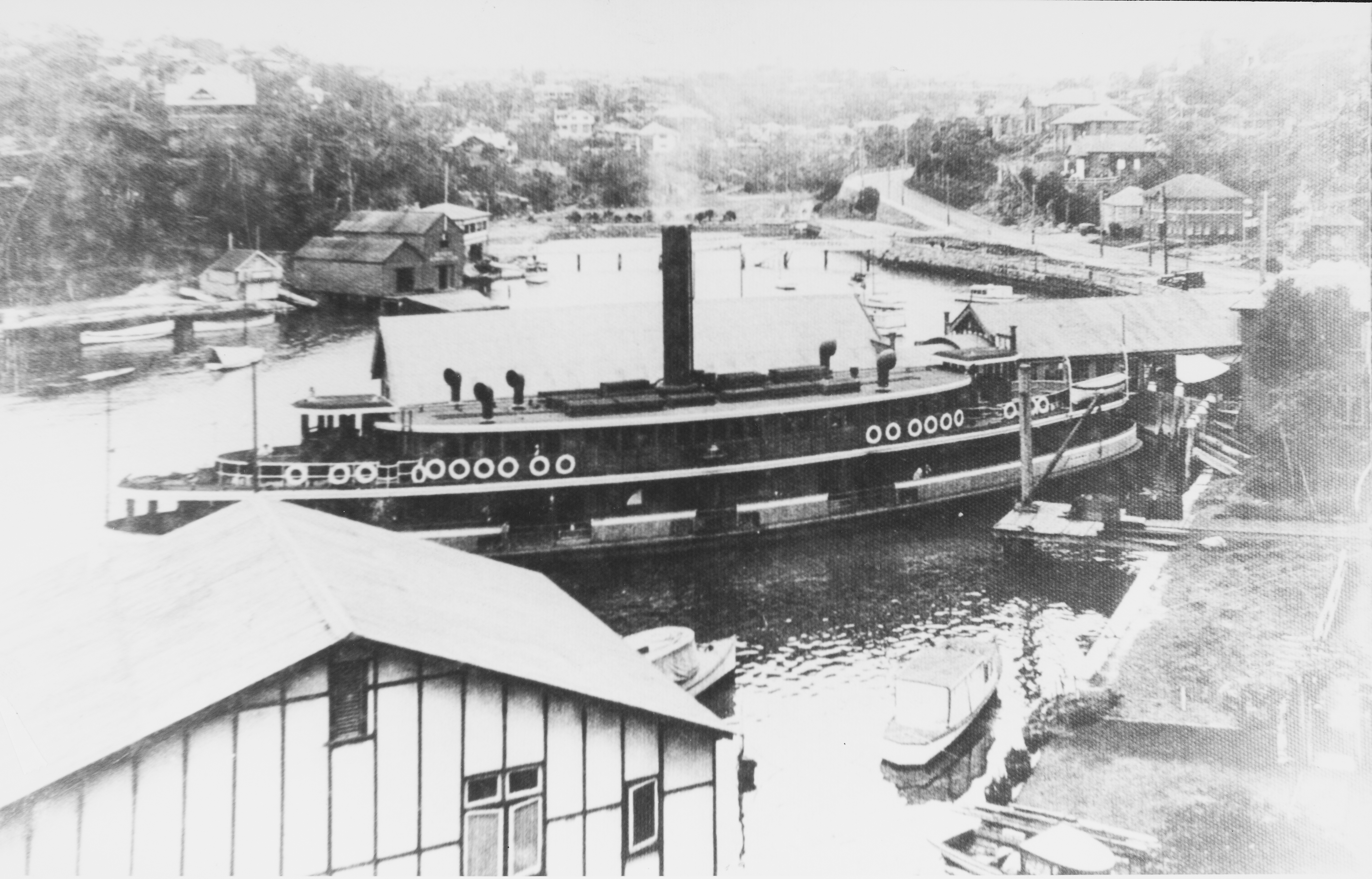
Kirawa at Mosman Wharf, early 1912-1920 (estimate)

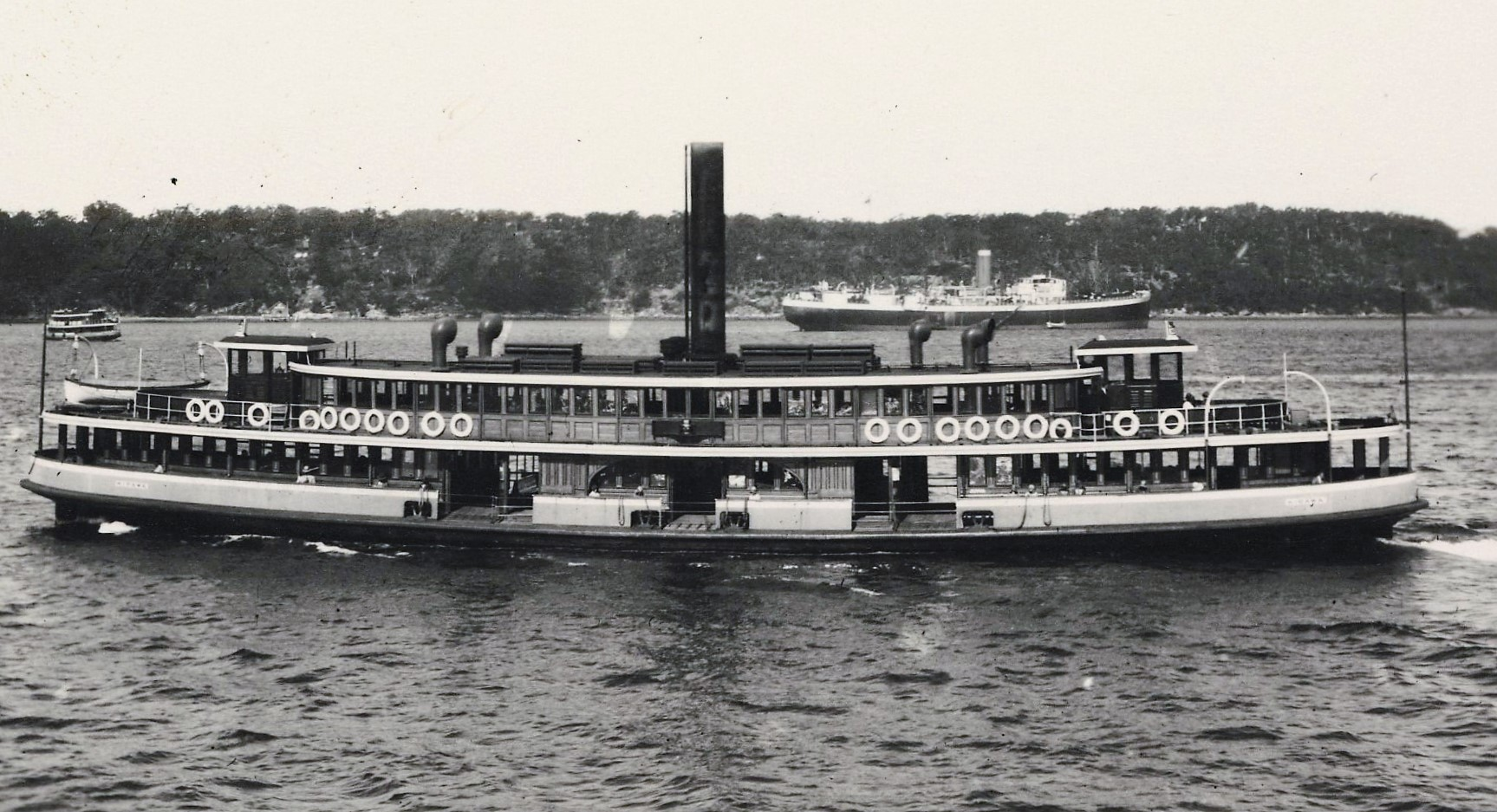
Kirawa approaching Mosman Bay with her original varnished timber and white/grey trim livery, 1920s

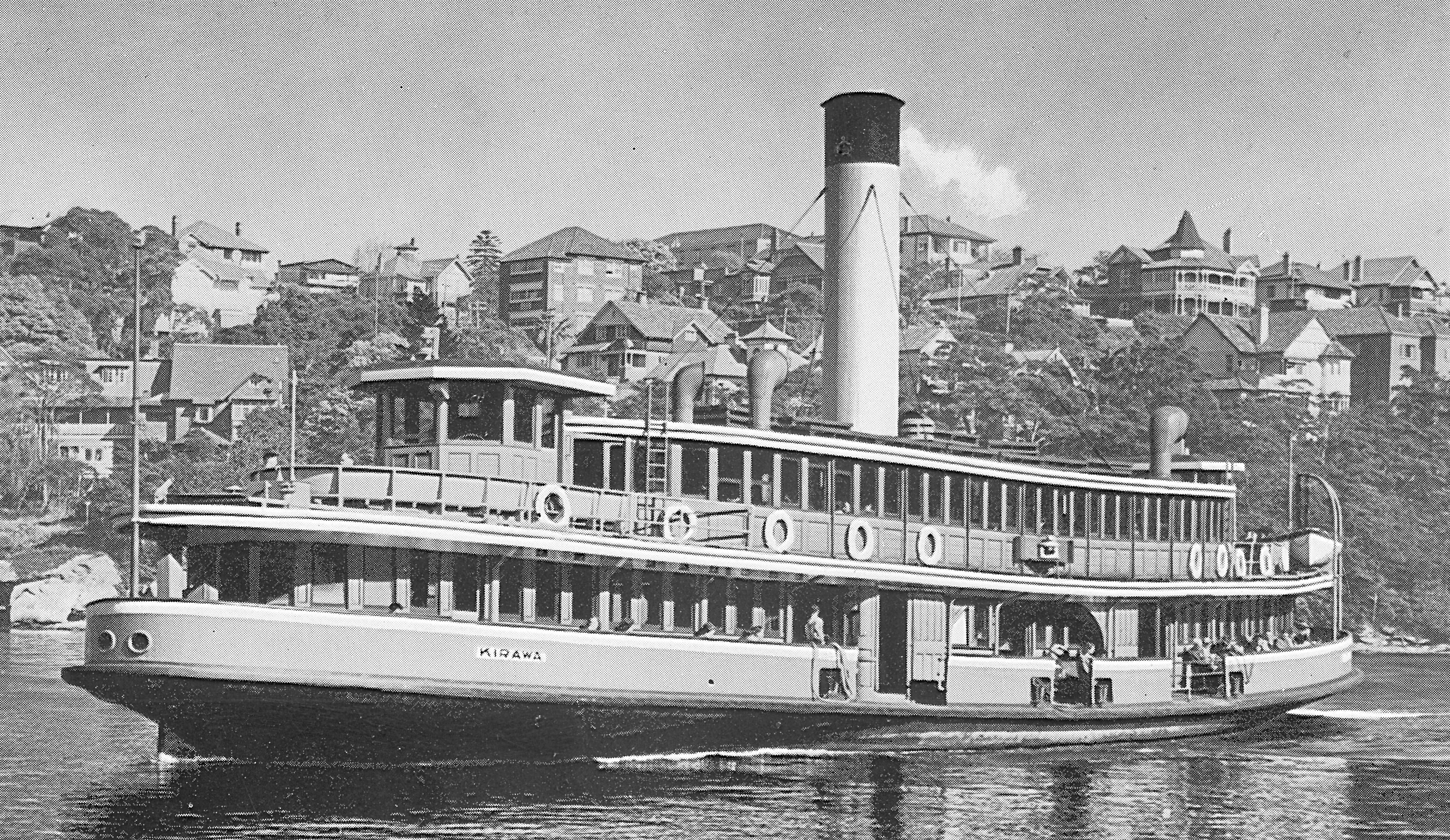
Kirawa in Mosman Bay in her 1930 yellow and green colour scheme, early 1950s

== Incidents ==
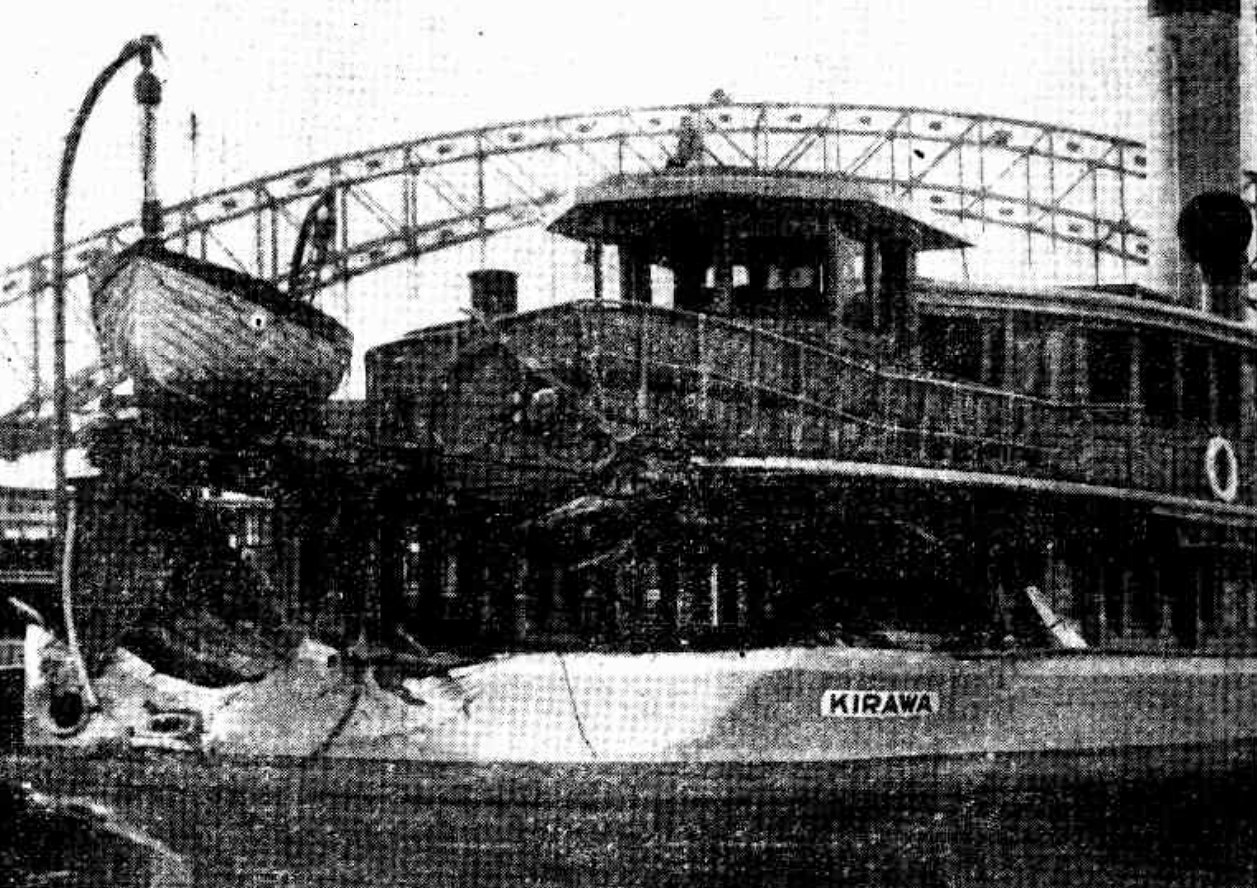
After collision at Circular Quay, 1949

- 14 August 1914 - Kirawa collided with Manly ferry Barrenjoey with the former sustaining damage to her bulwarks, but the latter remaining undamaged.
- 28 August 1920 - Kirawa collided with Kurraba off Kirribilli resulting in about 40 feet of the Kurraba's bulwarks being ripped out.
- 28 May 1925 - Kirawa (travelling from Circular Quay to Mosman) collided head-on with Koree (travelling from Mosman to Circular Quay) off Cremorne Point with both vessels sustaining damage.
- 20 July 1925 - ferry steamer Kirawa collided with tug Gamecock in Sydney Harbour resulting in a two-week suspension of the master of the Kirawa, William Clarabert Cross, Master's Certificate by the Marine Court.
- 9 December 1927 - Kirawa collided with sister Kanangra off Cremorne Point.
- 24 October 1928 - Kirawa collides Barwon near the entrance to Sydney Cove with Kirawa suffering significant damage with about 30 feet of her upper deck smashed. A marine court of inquiry found that the collision was caused by the Barwon manoeuvring in congested waters and the Kirawa's master not realising the Barwon had no headway on her.
- 30 October 1928 - Travelling between Mosman Bay wharf and Cremorne wharf, Kirawa lost control and struck a moored 25-foot private launch, Banoon, with Kirawa's propeller fouling Banoon's anchor chain. With the prospect of the disabled Kirawa striking rocks, Kanangra was brought over to assist. However, the smaller Banoon was caught between the two larger ferries, was crushed and sank. Kirawa's passengers were transferred to Kanangra, and Kirawa was towed to safety.
- 12 August 1936 - On leaving Mosman wharf with a full morning load, Kirawa went off course and her propellers scraped over rocks, however, no damage was found.
- 13 August 1937 - Kirawa collided with Kosciusko causing substantial damage to the latter's bow.
- 4 March 1949 - Significantly loaded with passengers, Kirawa's engines were started at Circular Quay without her master on board. With her steering locked, she travelled across Sydney Cove and crashed into a wharf causing significant damage.

== See also ==
- List of Sydney Harbour ferries
- Timeline of Sydney Harbour ferries
