= Old Cremorne ferry wharf =

Ferry wharf in North Sydney Council

Old Cremorne
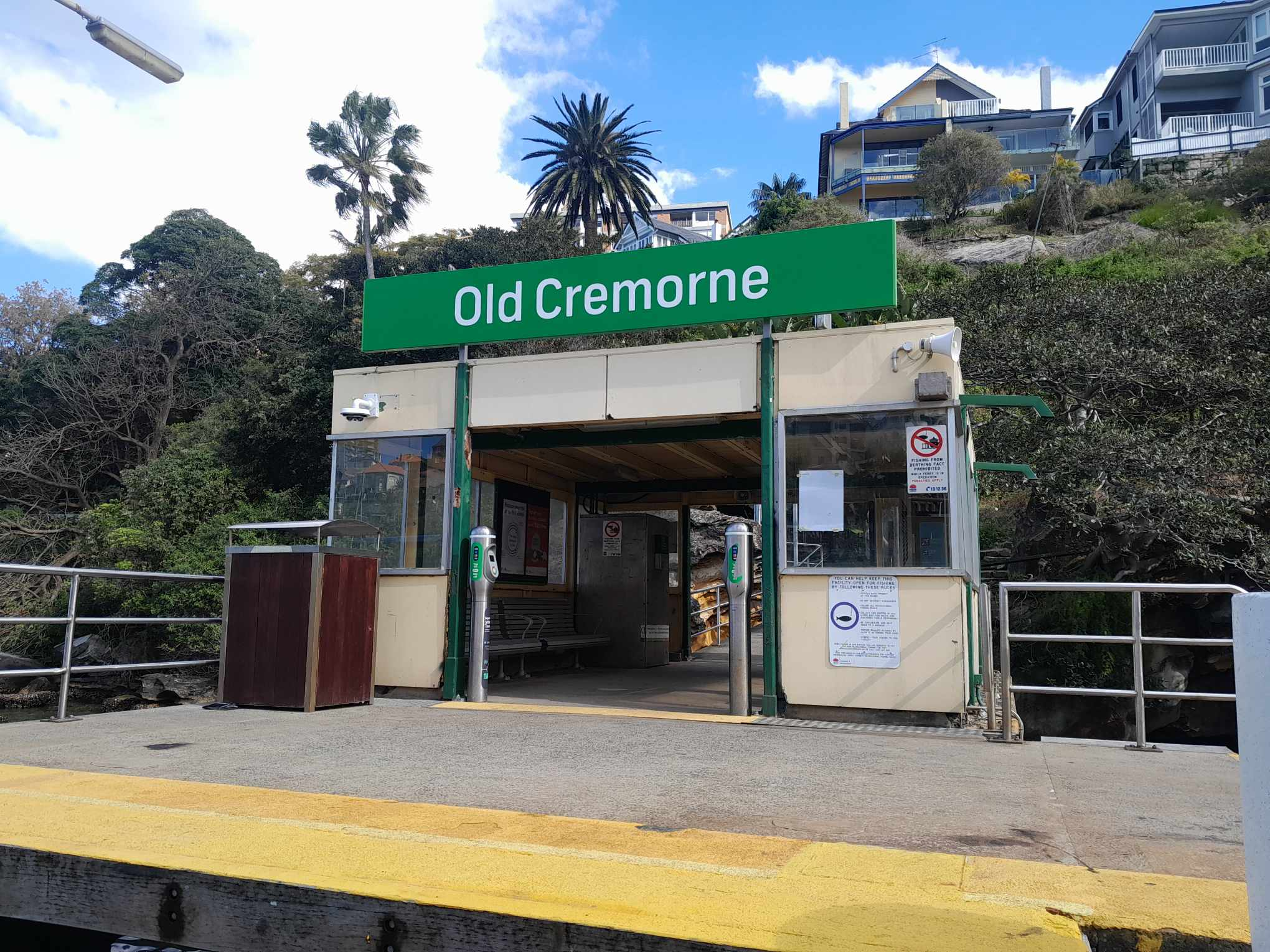
- Old Cremorne Wharf in 2024

General information
- Location: Sydney Harbour Foreshore Walk, Cremorne Point; New South Wales; Australia
- Coordinates: 33°50′27″S 151°13′50″E
- Owner: Transport for NSW
- Operator: Transdev Sydney Ferries
- Platforms: 1 wharf (1 berth)

Services
| Preceding wharf | Sydney Ferries | Following wharf |
|---|---|---|
| South Mosman towards Circular Quay | F6 Mosman Bay | Mosman Bay Terminus |
Location

Old Cremorne ferry wharf is located on the northern side of Sydney Harbour serving the North Sydney Council suburb of Cremorne.

Old Cremorne Wharf, in Mosman Bay on the eastern side of Cremorne Point, was built in the nineteenth century, before the 1911 opening of Cremorne Point Wharf with tram connection on the western end of the Point. The original wharf was at the current location of the Sydney Amateur Sailing Club, but was relocated slightly north to its current location before 1905. The wharf has no road access and is only accessible by foot along the Cremorne Point Reserve path.

== Services ==
Old Cremorne wharf is served by Sydney Ferries Mosman Bay services operated by First Fleet class ferries.

| Platform | Line | Stopping pattern | Notes |
| 1 | Mosman Bay ferry service | Shuttle to Mosman Bay; All stops to Circular Quay | |

== Historical gallery ==
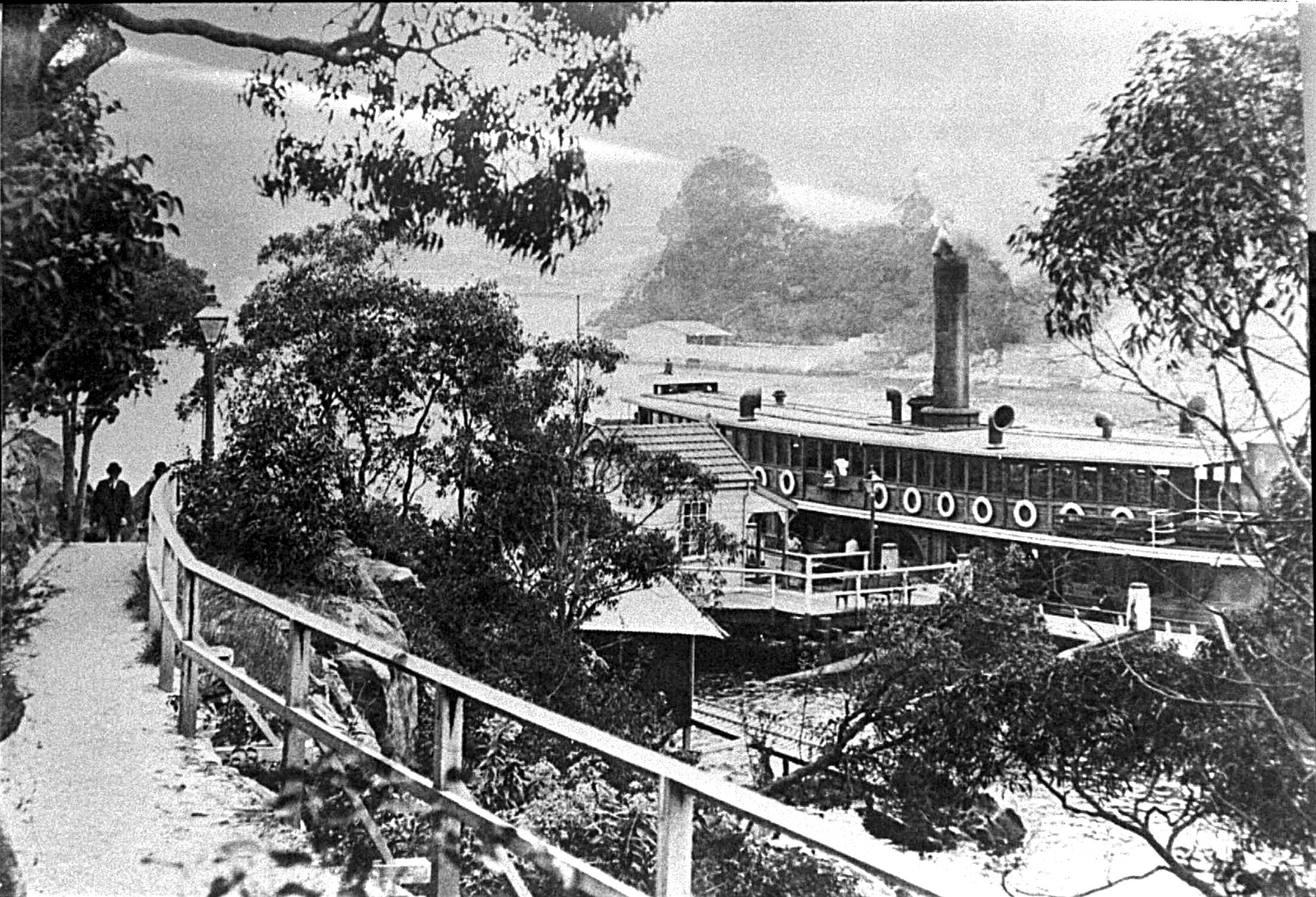
A then new K-class ferry at the wharf, 1905.

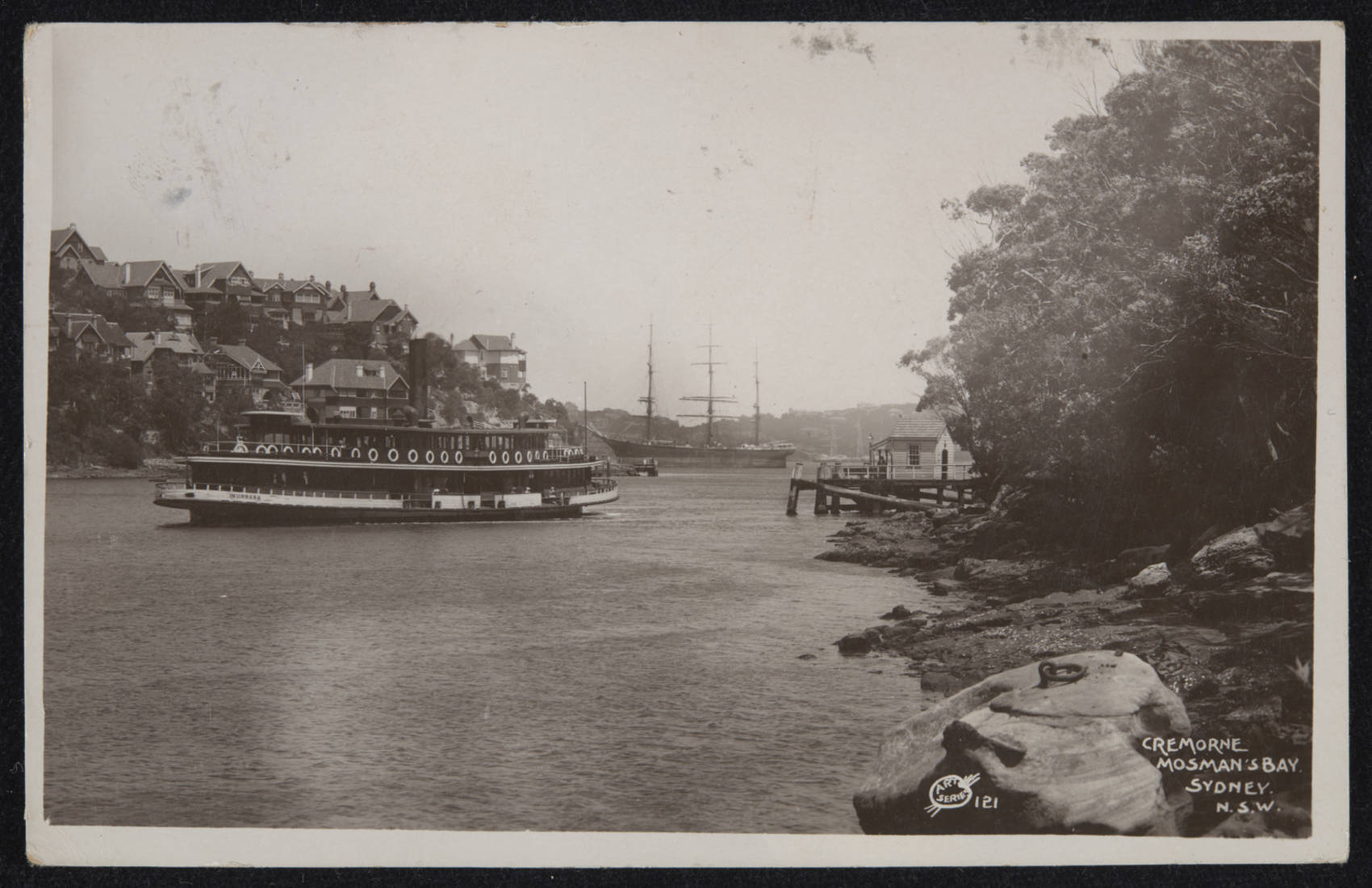
Kurraba approaches the wharf en route to Circular Quay, 1909

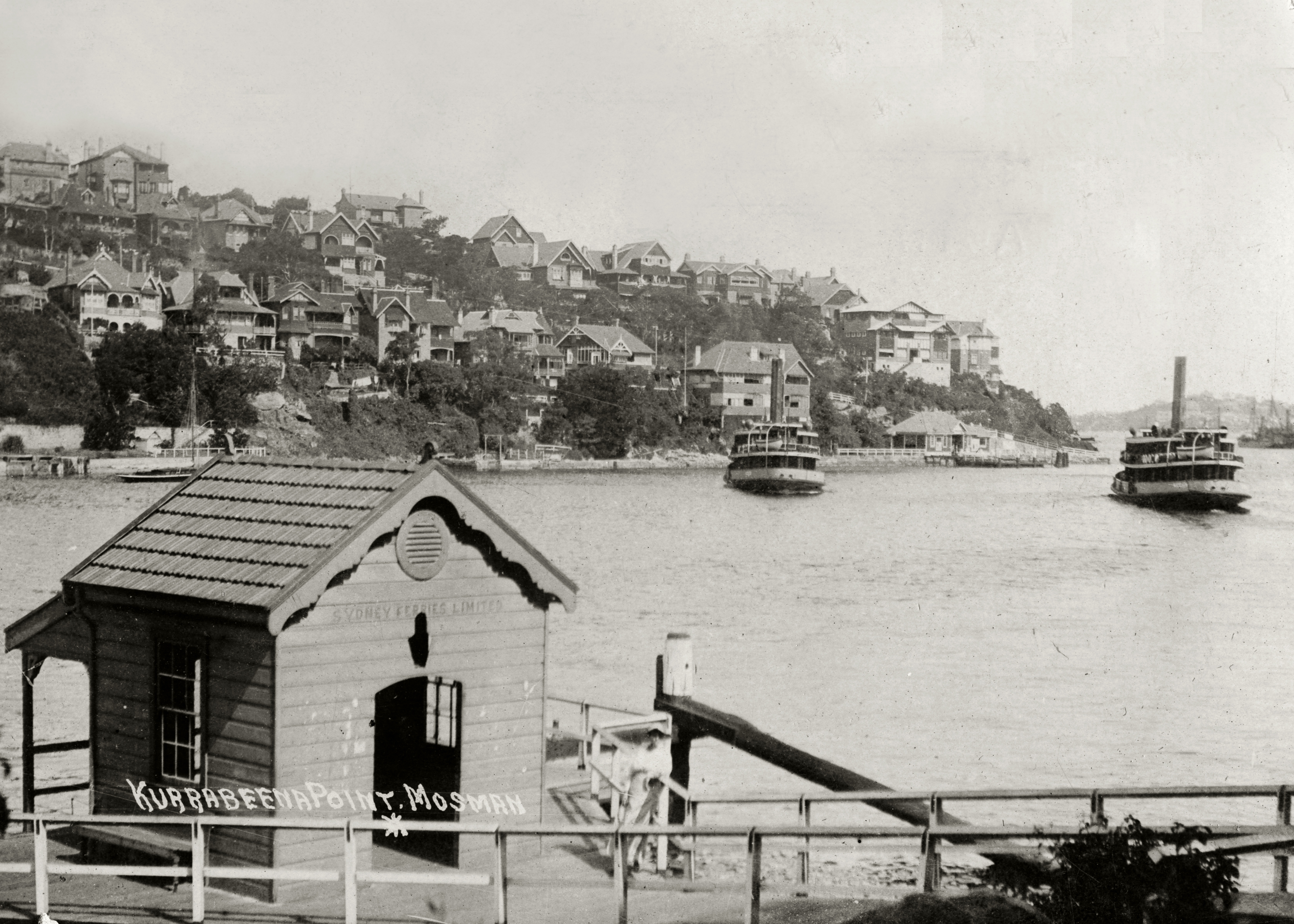
The wharf's former Edwardian shelter, c. 1930s. Curraghbeena Point and Musgrave Street Wharf (now Mosman South) in the background.

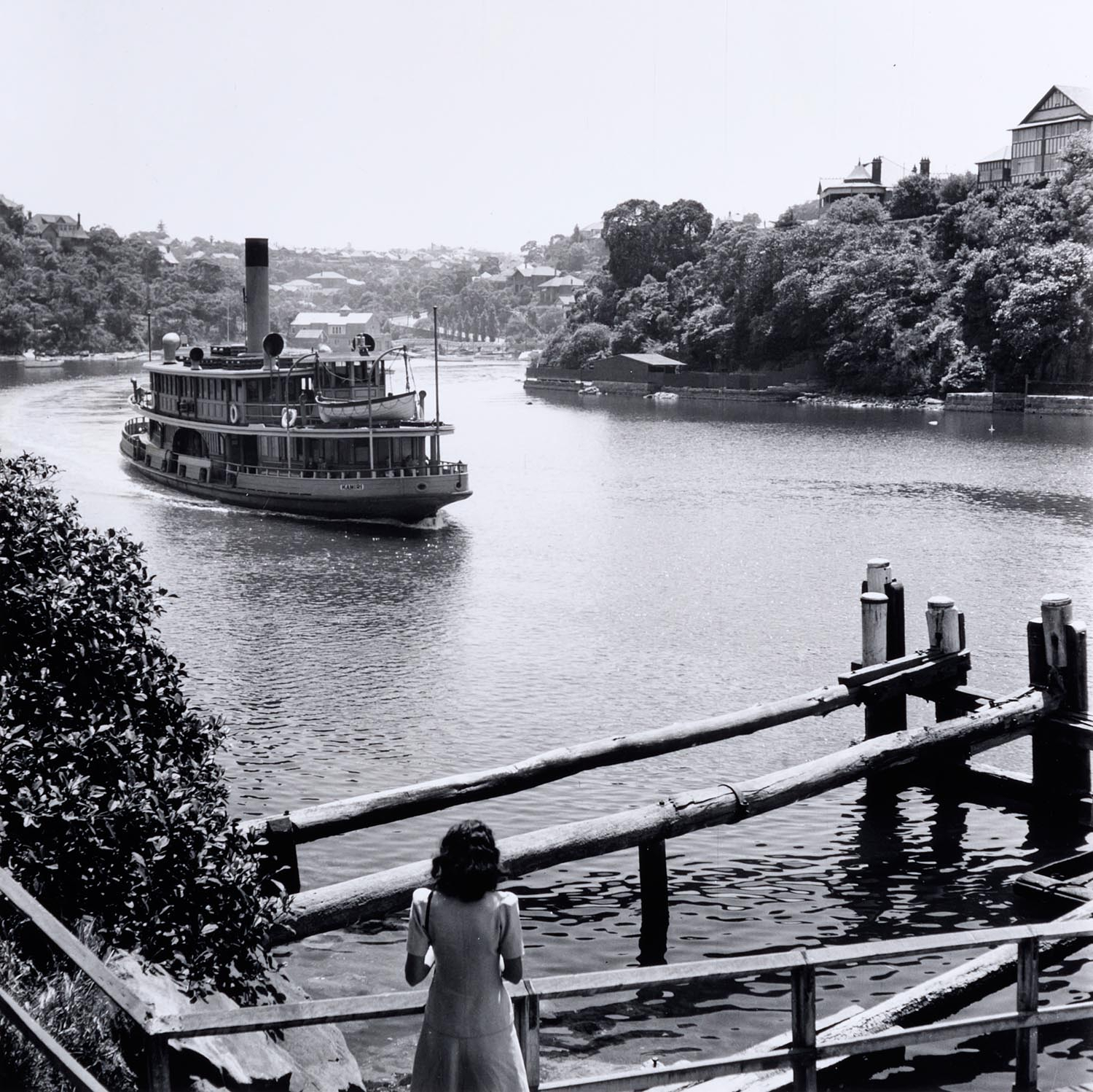
K-class steamer, Kamiri, approaches Old Cremorne Wharf, 1946. Photograph by Max Dupain

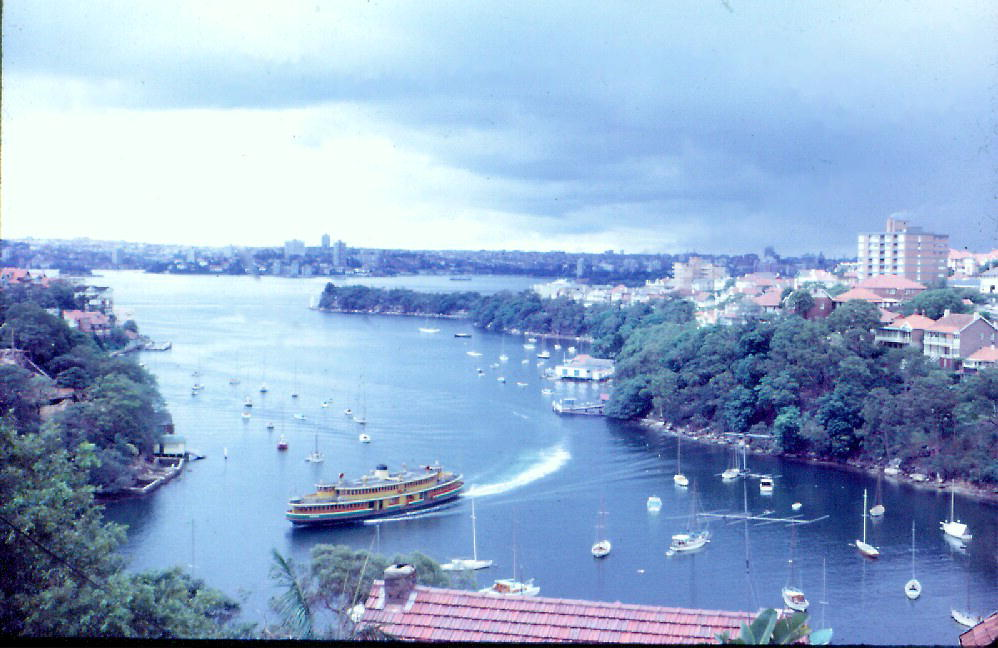
Kanangra leaving Old Cremorne Wharf. Photo shows the wharf's position in Mosman Bay on the eastern side of Cremorne Point.

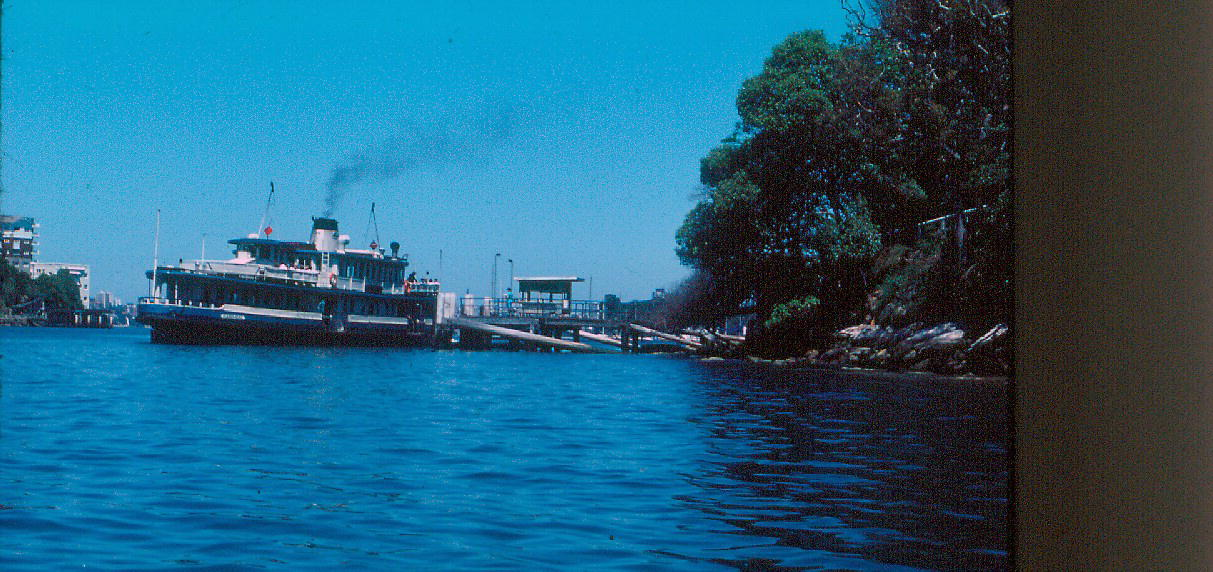
The timber wharf in 1982 before its 1985 replacement with a concrete structure

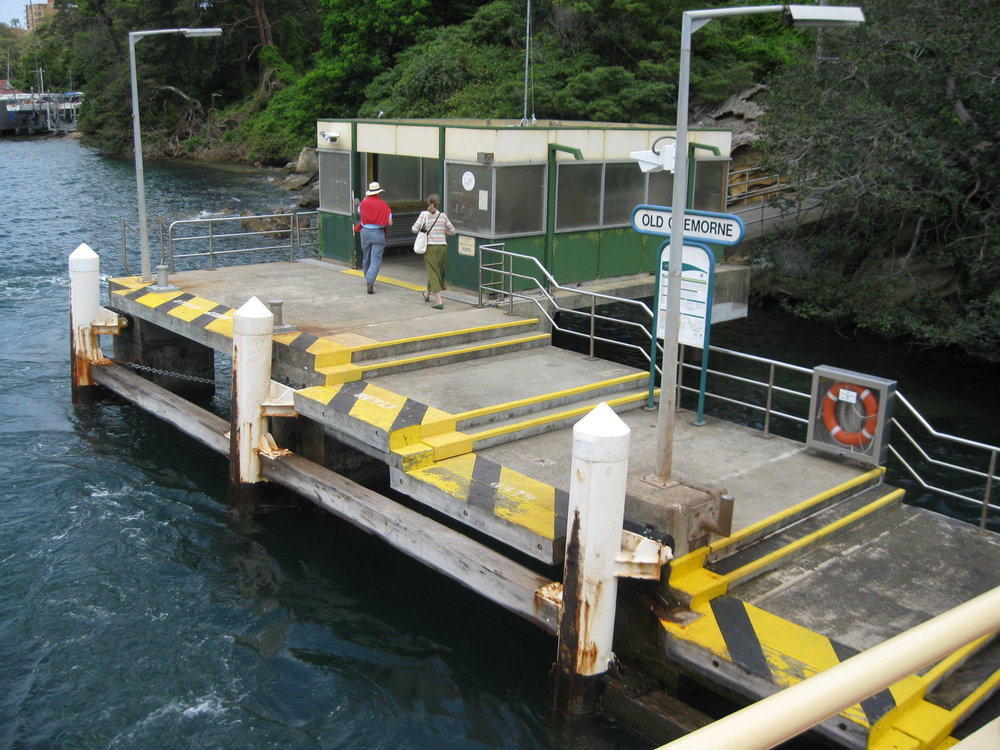
In 2009 showing its 1985 concrete reconstruction

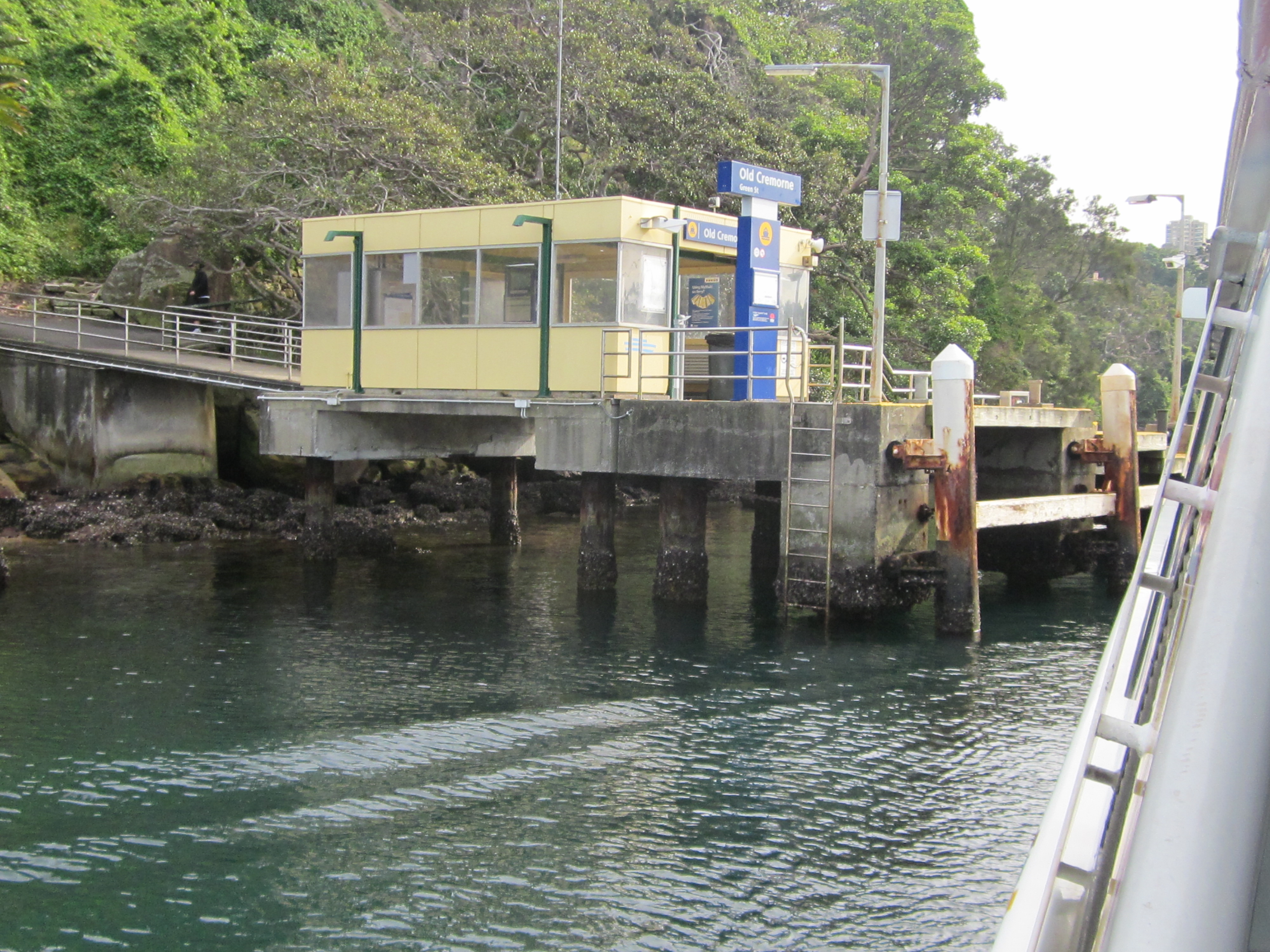
Old Cremorne Wharf in 2013
