= Kurraba and Kirribilli =

Ferries formerly used on Sydney Harbour

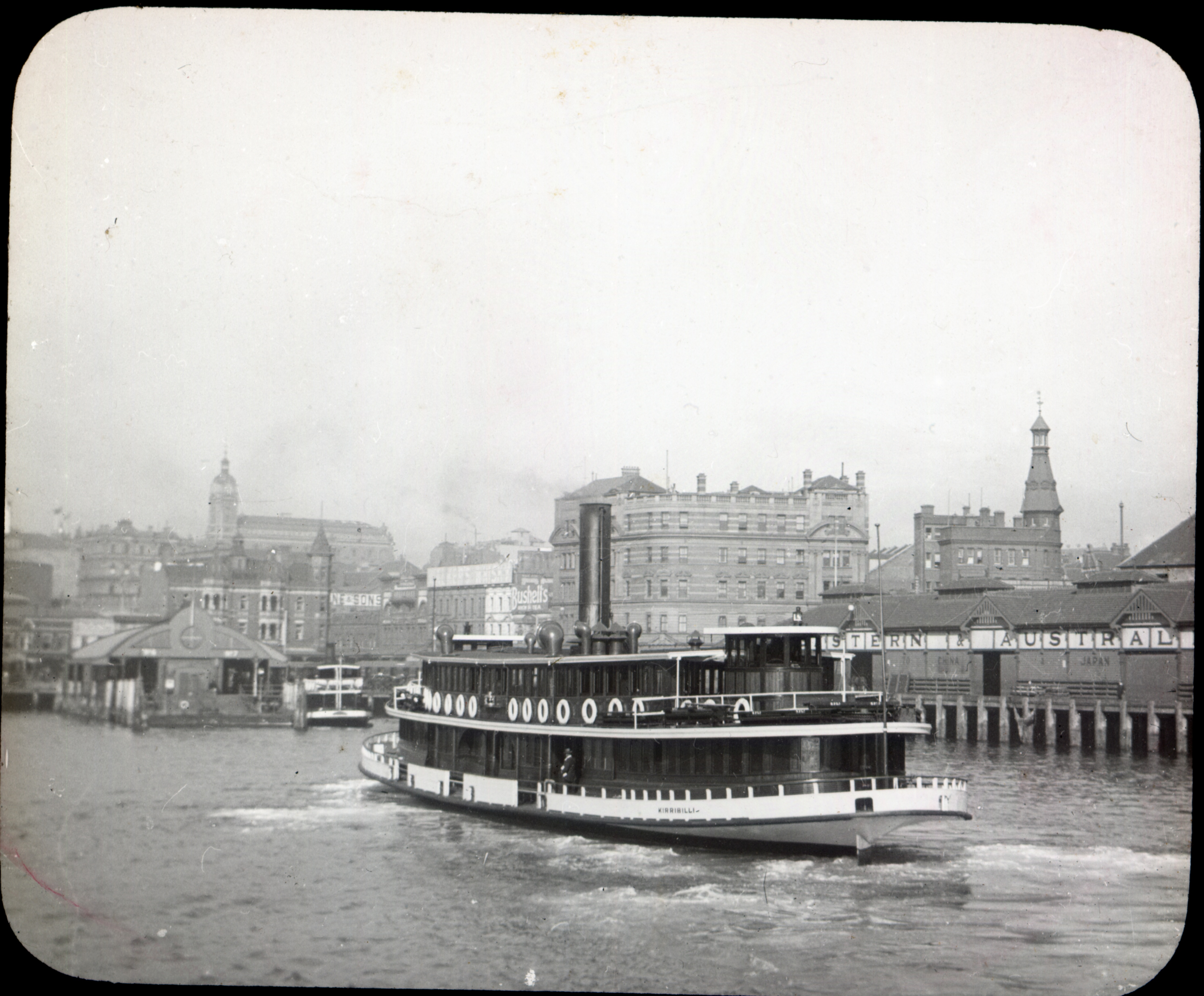
- Kirribilli approaches Circular Quay

History
- Name: Kurraba, Kirribilli
- Namesake: Kurraba, Kirribilli
- Operator: Sydney Ferries Limited
- Builder: Young and Son (Rozelle, Sydney)
- Cost: £9,440 (Kurraba) and £10,631 (Kirribilli)
- Launched: 1899 (Kurraba) & 1900 (Kirribilli)
- Out of service: between 1932 and 1934 (both ferries)
- Fate: Sold for breaking up, 1934

General characteristics
- Tonnage: 195 (Kurraba), 198 (Kirribilli)
- Length: 40.9 m (Kurraba), 39.7 m (Kirribilli)
- Installed power: 60 hp triple expansion steam
- Propulsion: double-ended screw
- Speed: 12 knots (both vessels)
- Capacity: 890 (Kurraba), 896 (Kirribilli)

Kurraba and Kirribilli were two similar "K-class" ferries on Sydney Harbour. Launched in 1899 and 1900 respectively, the two timber-hulled steamers were built for Sydney Ferries Limited during the boom in cross-harbour ferry travel prior to the opening of the Sydney Harbour Bridge.

When built, they were the largest of the cross-harbour ferries and brought new levels of comfort for passengers. They were the first true examples of what would come to be known as the "K-class" ferries - a group of 25 double deck, double-ended, predominantly timber-hulled (four later versions had steel hulls), screw ferries propelled by triple expansion steam engines.

Built for, and initially used on, the short but busy cross-harbour route between Circular Quay and Milsons Point, they were also used frequently on the Mosman route. Along with 17 others, the two ferries were sold for breaking up in 1934 following the opening of the Sydney Harbour Bridge in 1932.

== Background ==
Both ferries were built for Sydney Ferries Limited during the early twentieth century boom in cross-Harbour travel prior to the 1932 opening of the Sydney Harbour Bridge.

At the time, the company ran one of the largest ferry fleets in the world. The two ferries were part of broader type of around 20 double-ended timber screw ferries the Sydney K-class ferries that the company commissioned between the 1890s and early 1920s to meet the booming demand.

The two ferries were two of the first in what was to become a Sydney Ferries Limited tradition of naming their vessels after Australian Aboriginal words starting with "K". The names "Kurraba" and "Kirribilli" are both Australian Indigenous words thought to mean "good fishing spot". Kurraba Point and Kirribilli are also two suburbs on the northern shore of Sydney Harbour.

== Design and construction ==
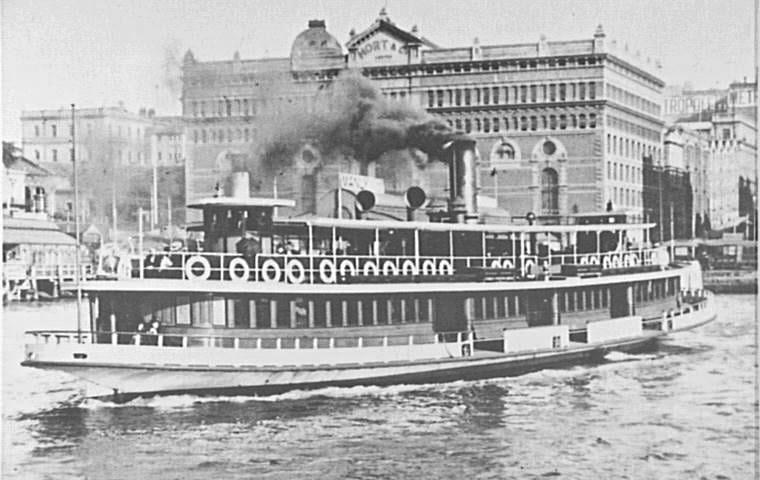
Kurraba as-built before her upper decks were enclosed in 1903

Kurraba and Kirribilli were designed by Captain Sumberbell, manager of Sydney Ferries Limited. Their design was a significant evolution of the company's smaller double-ended screw ferries, such as Kangaroo (1891 - 1926) and Carabella (1897 - 1932). Both vessels were built at Young and Son at Rozelle. Kurraba cost the company £9,440 while Kirribilli cost £10,631.

The keels were built in three pieces from ironbark and the keelsons (moulded 10 ^{1/2} inch, sided 12 inch and fastened with metal bolts), were also ironbark. Decks, sides, and fittings were built from kauri pine. The vessels were built with five watertight compartments with one amidships made of iron. Electric lighting was provided throughout, a relatively recent feature on Sydney Harbour ferries. A smoking and ladies saloon was provided on the main deck.

Unlike Kurraba, Kirribilli's lower deck windows were tinted an amber colour to minimise glare and heat from the sun. During construction of both vessels, newspapers suggested that the upper decks would be enclosed, a first for Sydney Harbour ferries, however, the ferries' were put into service with the then conventional open upper decks. The upper decks were enclosed with sash windows around 1903 except at the ends behind the wheelhouses which remained open. All subsequent K-class ferries were built similarly with most, and then the full length, of their upper decks enclosed.

The two ferries had triple expansion steam engines with cylinders of 13, 21, and 34 inches diameter respectively, with a 21 inch stroke. Her two multi-tubular cylindrical boilers were 5.5 metres long with an internal diameter of 2.18 metres. Kurraba's machinery was built by Campbell and Calderwood of Glasgow, imported by Wildridge and Sinclair and installed in Sydney by Begg and Greig. Kirribilli's engines were provided by Mort's Dock and Engineering of Balmain.

Kurraba at 195 tons and 40.9 metres long was the largest of the Sydney Ferries Ltd fleet at her introduction. Kirribilli would be 198 tons but slightly shorter at 39.7 metres. With the continuing rapid expansion of the Sydney Ferries Limited fleet, by 1912, there were another fifteen vessels in the passenger fleet, nine of which were larger than Kirribilli.

== Service history ==
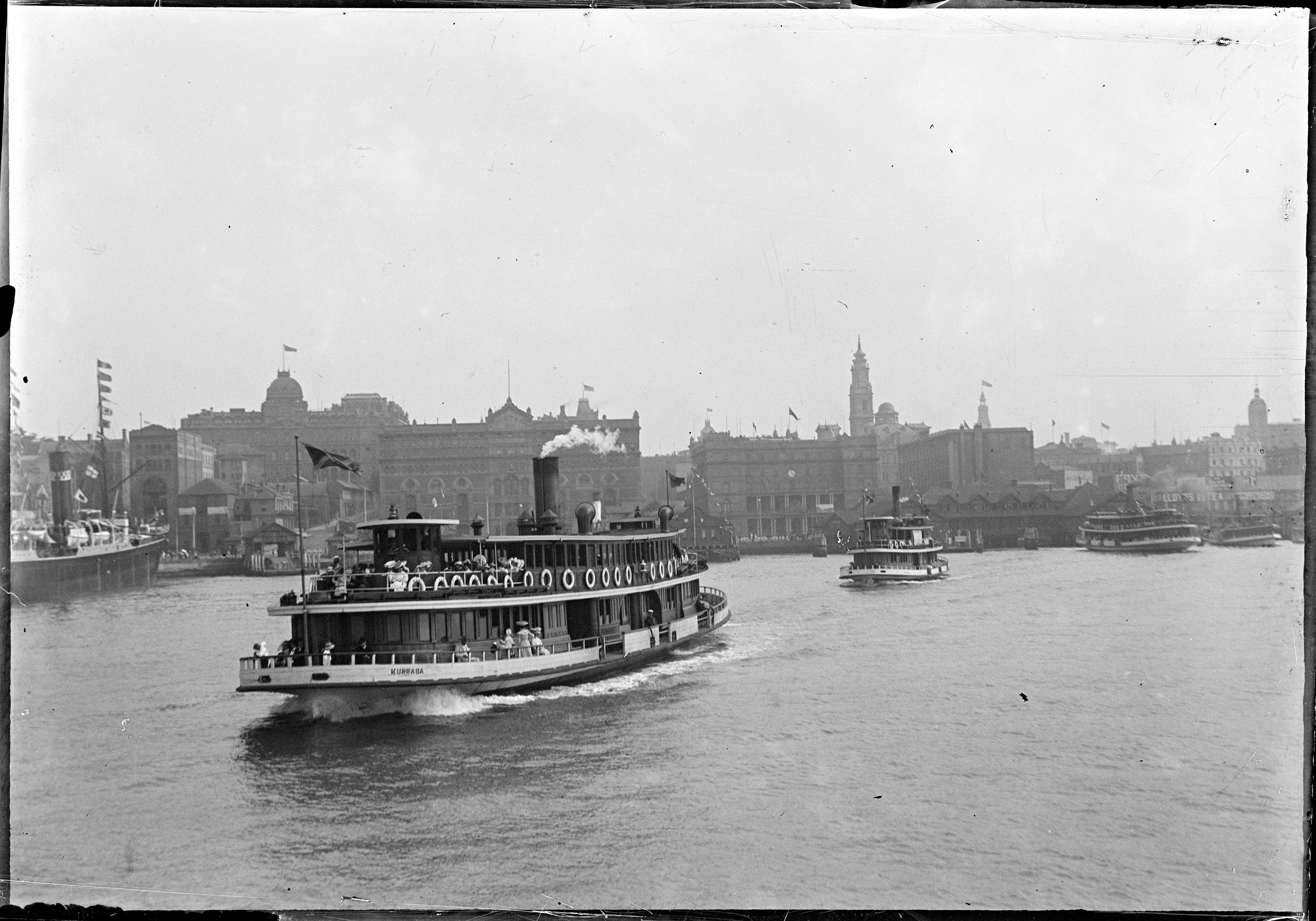
Kurraba leaving Circular Quay

Kurraba was christened at the builder's yard on 22 July 1899 by Miss Robertson, daughter of one of the ferry company's director. She was to have been launched that same day, but conditions prevented it. Following several subsequent attempts that week, she was launched on 28 July. She had her trials on 7 November 1899 during which she reached a speed of close to 12 knots. She commenced service on 7 November 1899.

Kirribilli was launched on 30 December 1899 at the yard of Young and Son at Rozelle. Her trials were held on 29 March 1900 during which she also attained 12 knots. The day included a trip to Middle Harbour with guests of the company. She commenced service on the Milsons Point run the following week under the command of Captain E Bridge who had helmed the company's Kangaroo for the previous 10 years.

The largest ferries in the fleet when introduced, both Kurraba and Kirribilli were initially used predominantly on the busy cross harbour routes to Milsons Point. Kurraba was used on the Mosman route after the 1902 introduction of the larger Koree to the Milsons Point run. Soon both Kurraba and Kirribilli would work on the busy Mosman route.

On 19 March 1932, the Sydney Harbour Bridge was open. Sydney Ferries Limited patronage fell from 40 million annually to 15 million. The Milsons Point service was quickly redundant. 17 vessels from the fleet were retired from service, including Kurraba and Kirribilli being among the oldest of the K-class ferries. They were sold for breaking up in 1934 for £75 each.

== Incidents ==
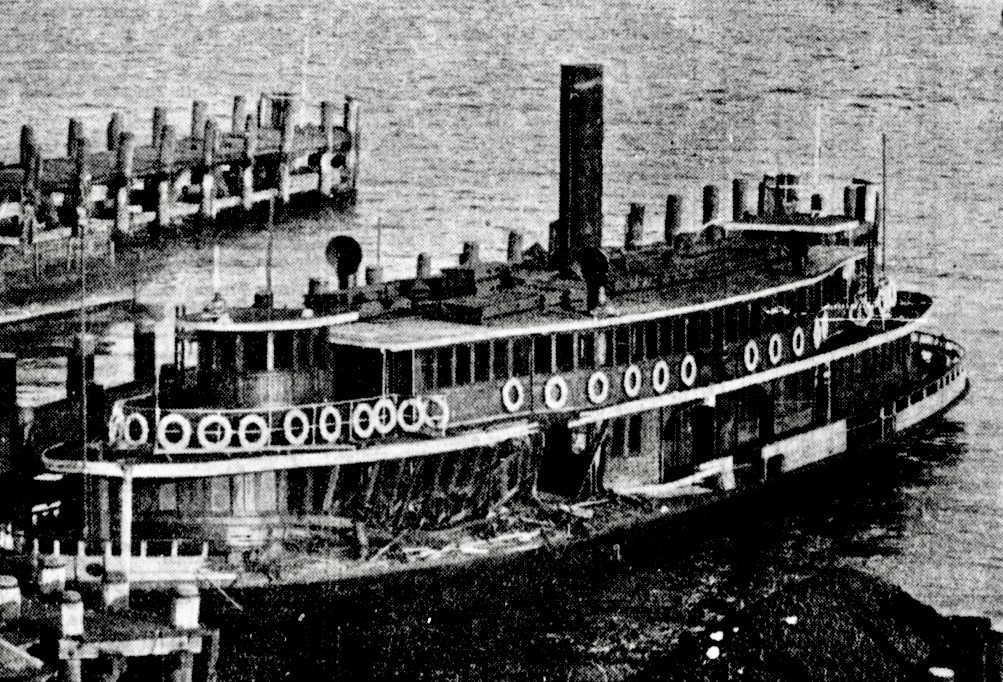
A damaged Kurraba at McMahons Point after collision with Kirribilli, 24 February 1932

Like all ferries, Kurraba and Kirribilli were involved in their fair share of incidents, including on two occasions (1904 and 1932) colliding with each other causing significant damage:

- 30 June 1900 - A passenger, gardener Charles Valley, attempts to jump off from the Kurraba as it is berthing at Milsons Point Wharf, but falls between the ferry and wharf and is crushed. He dies two later of his injuries in Sydney Hospital.
- 29 November 1901 - Kurraba collides with paddle steamer ferry Bunya Bunya (built 1885) off Dawes Point. Kurraba, was traveling from Milsons Point to Circular Quay and Bunya Bunya was travelling from the Quay. Kurraba's bow crashed into Bunya Bunya's starboard paddle box which was severely damaged disabling the paddler. Sydney Ferries Limited steamer, Kangaroo, was nearby and towed the paddler to the Company's works depot at Milsons Point. Kurraba's bulwarks and passenger rail were damaged at a point, but not severe and she continued on her service.
- 14 March 1904 - Kirribilli and Kurraba collide near the entrance to Sydney Cove, with Kurraba rising up out of the water onto Kirribilli as the latter heels on impact. Kirribilli's bulwarks are torn out and parts of the gentleman's saloon is crushed. Kurraba's damage was limited to a rudder pin.
- 21 June 1912 - Kirribilli collides with Koree at McMahon's Point with the latter ferry's sponson rising up and stripping away 18 feet of the former's bulwarks.
- 27 February 1914 - Kirribilli is involved in a minor collision with ferry Kangaroo near Bennelong Point.
- 28 August 1920 - Kurraba collided with Kirawa off Kirribilli resulting in about 40 feet of the Kurraba's bulwarks being ripped out.
- September 1924, Kurraba collides with Kosciusko in Neutral Bay. Kurraba is significantly damaged with bulwarks ripped away and her cabin bulwark smashed. Damage to Kosciusko was light in comparison. Both ferries were carrying large numbers of passengers, but there were no injuries.
- 25 February 1932 - Kirribilli and Kurraba collide near Bennelong Point significantly damaging their timber work, although all damage was above the waterline. Both ferries listed on impact and were locked together momentarily. Kurraba's passenger cabin was pushed in. Although some passengers were covered with smashed glass, none were injured.

== Kurraba ==
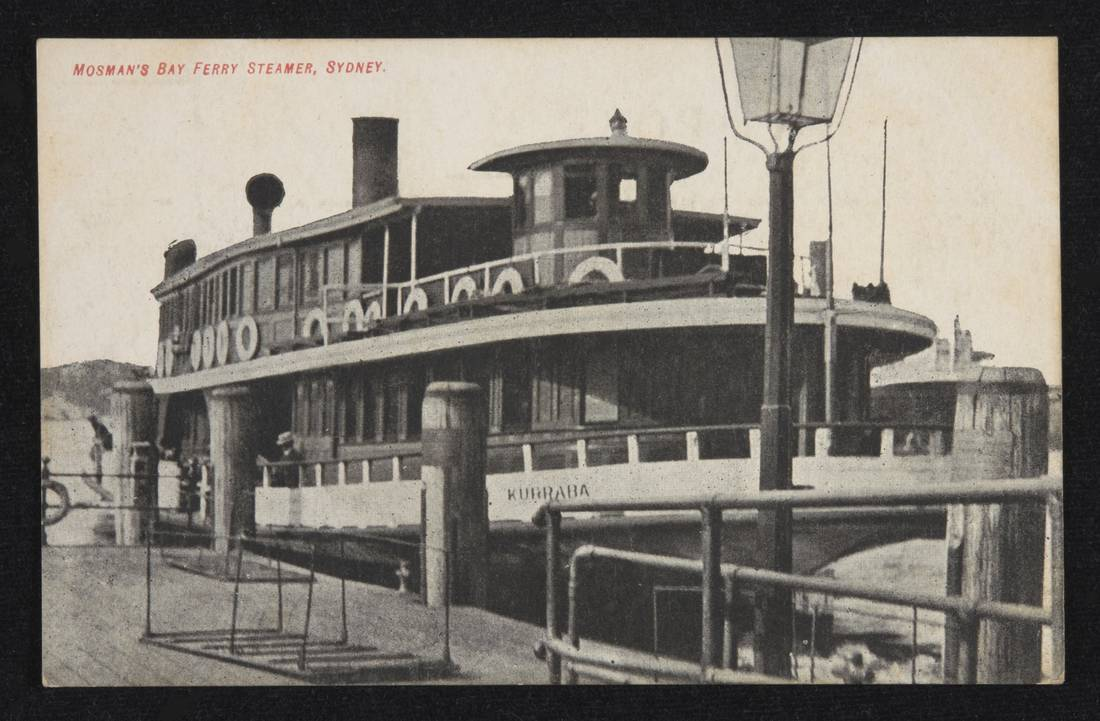
With enclosed upper decks, remaining open behind the wheelhouses.

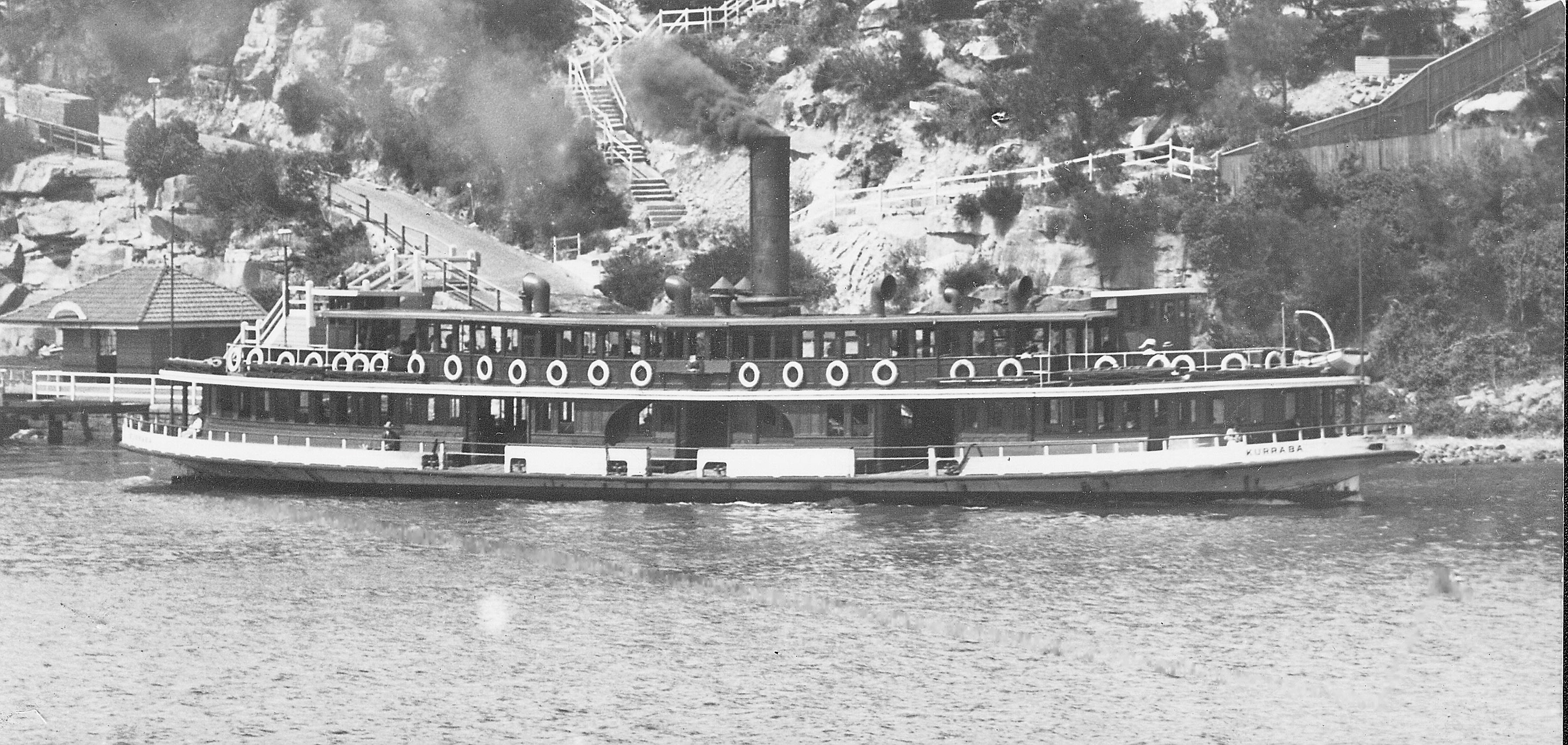
At Musgrave Street Wharf (now South Mosman ferry wharf)

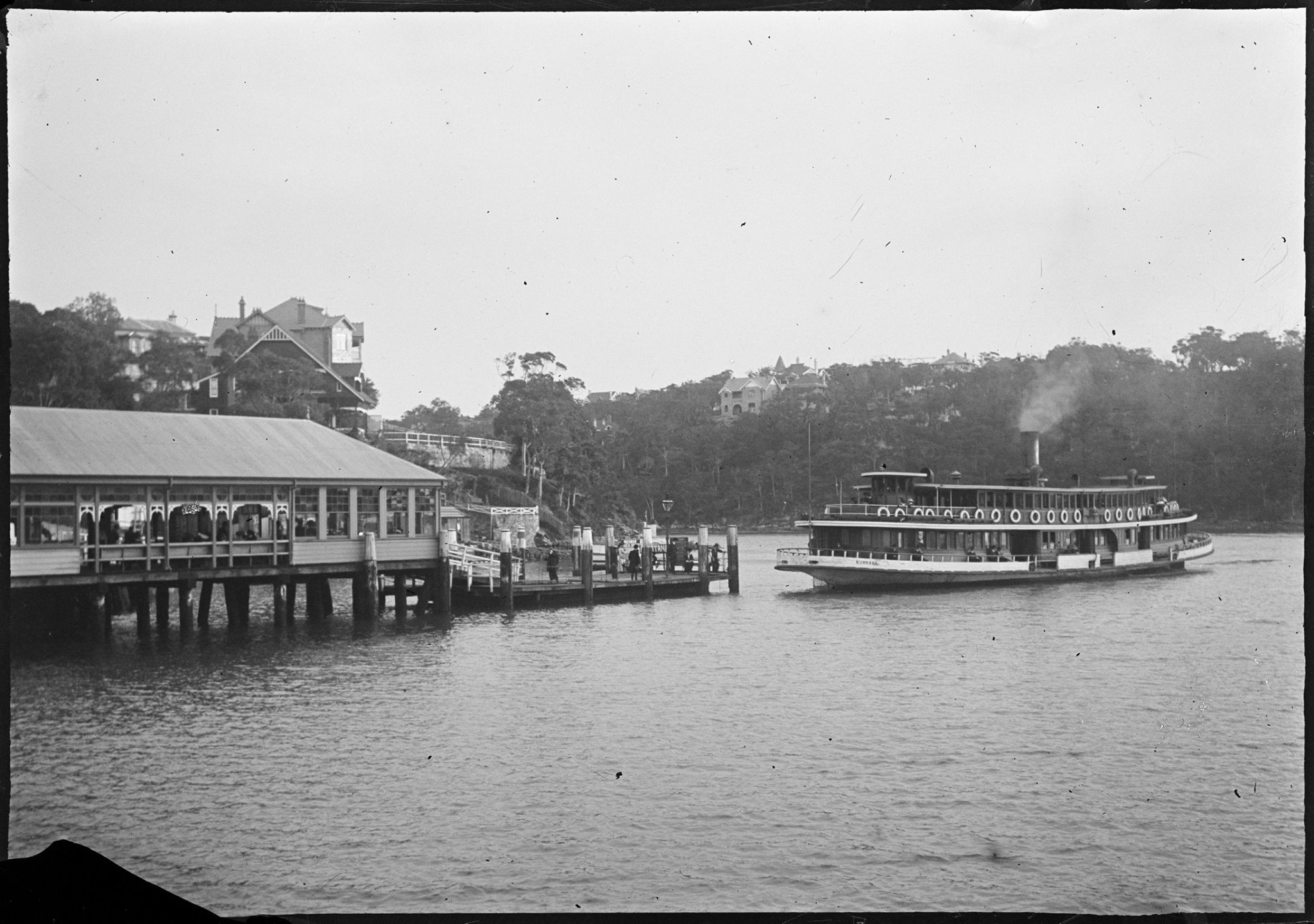
In Mosman Bay

== Kirribilli ==
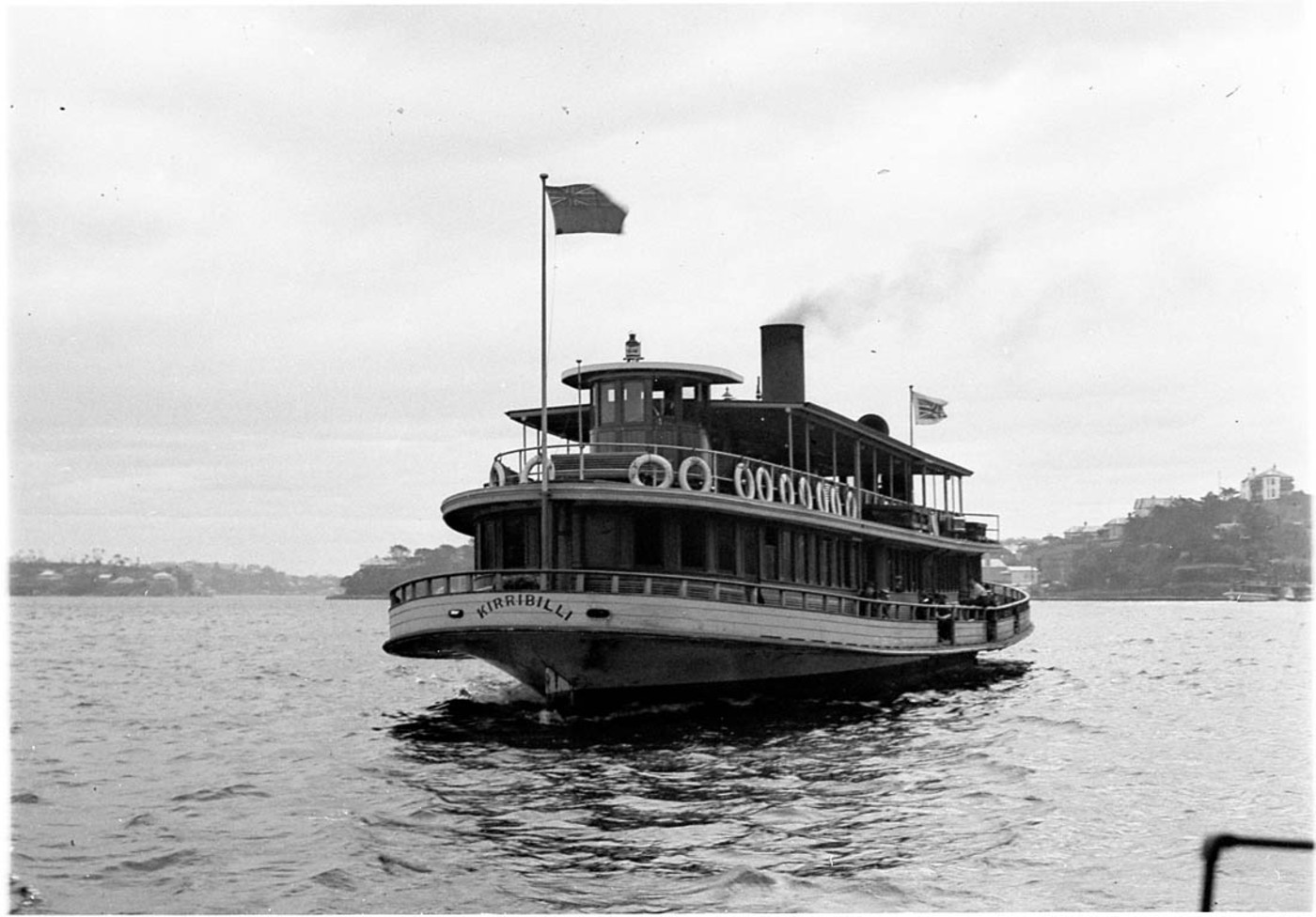
As built

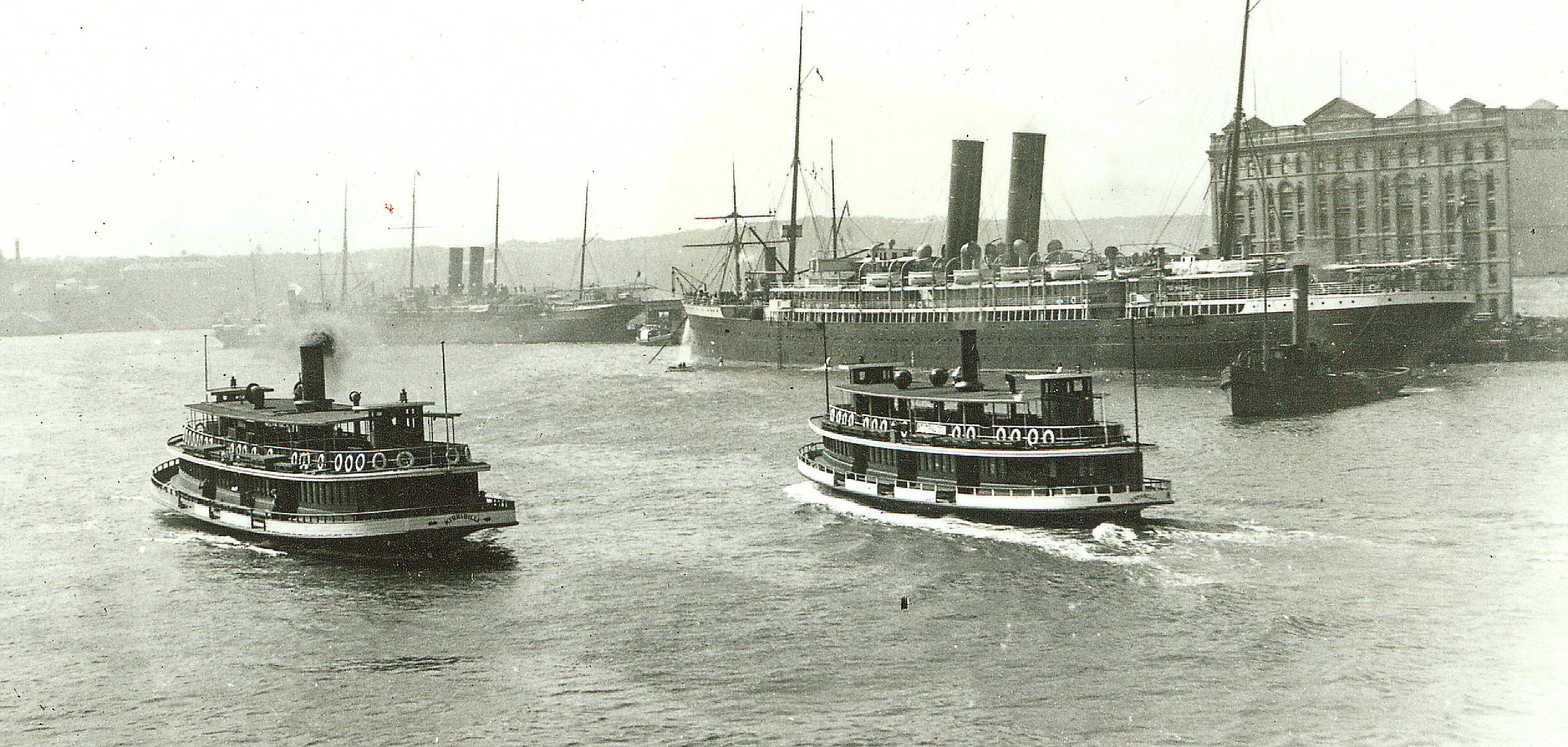
As built with open top deck, alongside Carabella

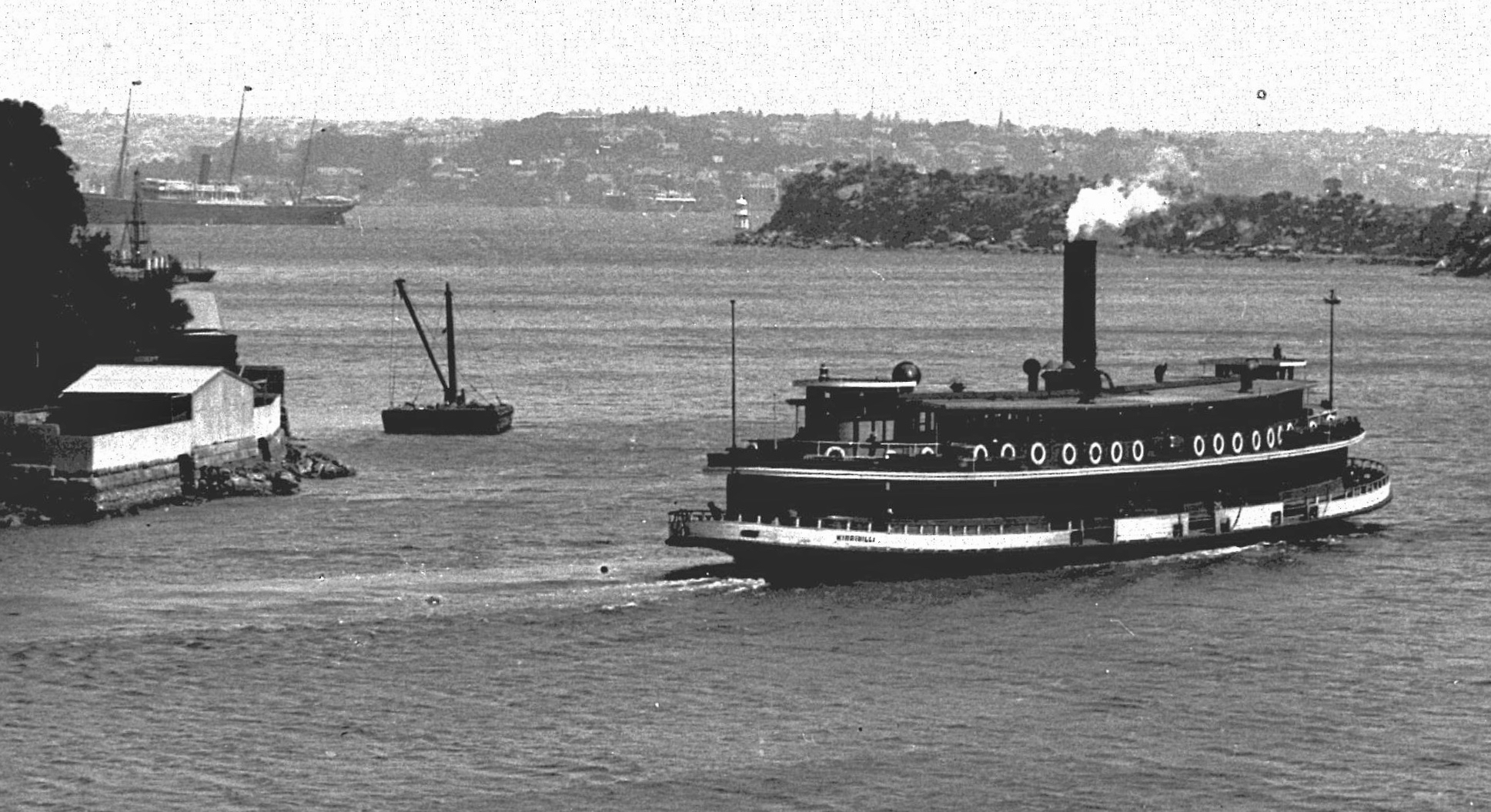
Leaving Mosman Bay

== See also ==
- List of Sydney Harbour ferries
- Timeline of Sydney Harbour ferries
- Sydney K-class ferries
