= Mosman Bay ferry service =

Ferry service in Sydney

F6 Mosman Bay

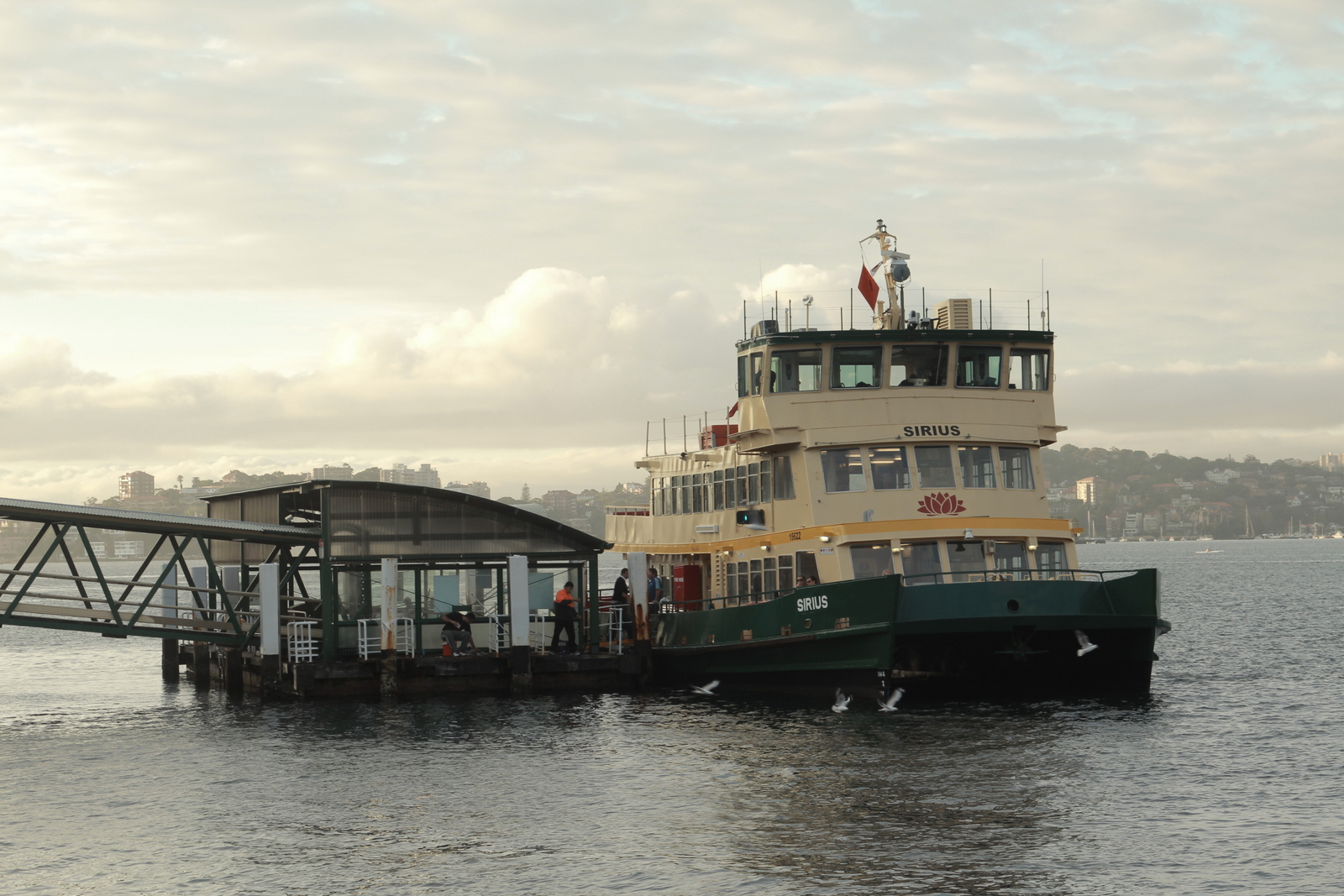
- Locale: Sydney
- Transit type: Commuter ferry
- Fleet: First Fleet
- Owner: Sydney Ferries
- Operator: Transdev Sydney Ferries
- No. of terminals: 5

The Mosman Bay ferry service (numbered F6) is a commuter ferry route in Sydney, New South Wales, Australia. Part of the Sydney Ferries network, it serves several Lower North Shore suburbs around Mosman Bay.

Services begin on the southern side of Sydney Harbour at Circular Quay, then head northeast to the Cremorne Point wharf. Proceeding around Robertsons Point, ferries travel up Mosman Bay to the terminus. Services operate every half hour on weekdays and every hour at night and on weekends.

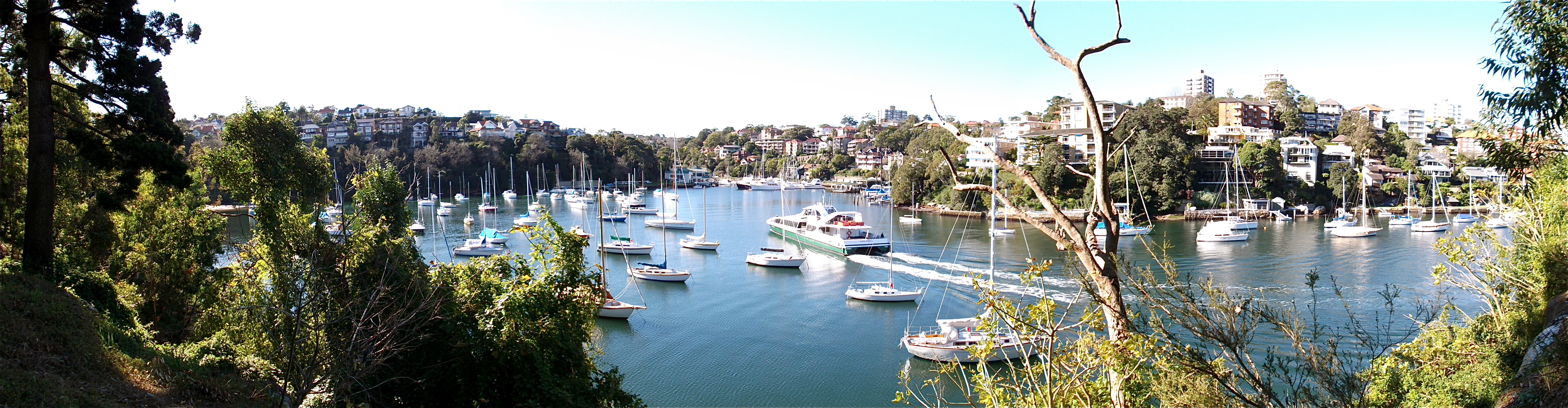
Panoramic view of Mosman Bay, from Cremorne Point. Susie O'Neill is traveling up the bay.

== Wharves ==
| Name | Waterway | Suburbs served | Connections | Information on wharf | Photo of wharf |
|---|---|---|---|---|---|
| Circular Quay | Sydney Cove | Sydney CBD, The Rocks | Manly ferry service Taronga Zoo ferry service Parramatta River ferry service Pyrmont Bay ferry service Neutral Bay ferry service Double Bay ferry service Cockatoo Island ferry service Watsons Bay ferry service | Circular Quay wharf is located at the northern end of the Sydney central business district. The locality of Circular Quay is a major Sydney transport hub, with a large ferry, heavy rail, light rail and bus interchange. | |
| Cremorne Point | Sydney Cove | Cremorne Point | (peak hour only) | Cremorne Point ferry wharf is located at the end of Milson Road, at the southern end of Cremorne Point. It consists of a single wharf. The wharf was extensively damaged during a storm in June 2007. It reopened in September 2007. It was rebuilt between October 2014 and February 2015. In 2022 the wharf's roof was removed due to structural concerns. | |
| South Mosman | Mosman Bay | Mosman | | South Mosman ferry wharf is located at the end of Musgrave St, and hence is marked "Musgrave St. Wharf" on some publications. It serves the suburb of Mosman and consists of a single wharf. In June 2024 South Mosman ferry wharf temporally closed while the wharf was rebuilt to include a new wharf and lift. | |
| Old Cremorne | Mosman Bay | Cremorne | | Old Cremorne ferry wharf is located near Kareela Road in Cremorne Point. It serves central area of the suburb and consists of a single wharf. | |
| Mosman Bay | Mosman Bay | Mosman | (Morning Peak only to Circular Quay via Taronga Zoo) | Mosman Bay ferry wharf is located at the end of Avenue Road, Mosman. It consists of a single wharf. The wharf was rebuilt between March and October 2014. | |

== Patronage ==
The following table shows the patronage of Sydney Ferries network for the year 2025.

2025-26 Sydney Ferries annual patronage by line (Note: Figures based on Opal tap on and tap off data)
| Manly ferry service | 4,532,938 | View source data. |
| Taronga Zoo ferry service | 1,545,805 | View source data. |
| Parramatta River ferry service | 2,429,310 | View source data. |
| Pyrmont Bay ferry service | 2,779,319 | View source data. |
| Neutral Bay ferry service | 562,998 | View source data. |
| Mosman Bay ferry service | 709,762 | View source data. |
| Double Bay ferry service | 273,741 | View source data. |
| Cockatoo Island ferry service | 535,934 | View source data. |
| Watsons Bay ferry service | 1,873,854 | View source data. |
| Blackwattle Bay ferry service | 17,970 | |
