= Cremorne Point ferry wharf =

Ferry wharf in Sydney

Cremorne Point
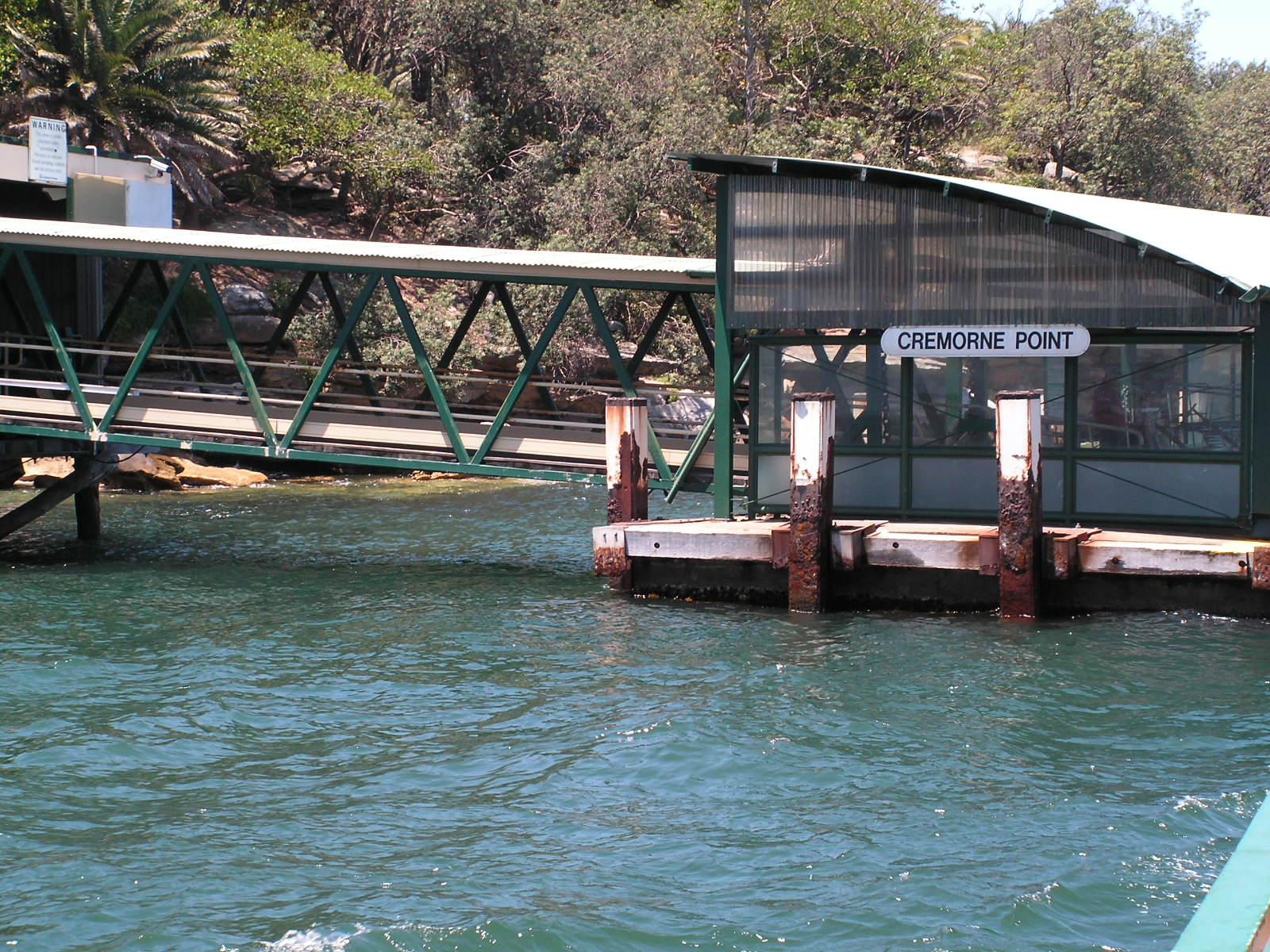
- Former wharf in March 2007

General information
- Location: Milson Road, Cremorne Point; New South Wales; Australia
- Coordinates: 33°50′53″S 151°13′51″E
- Owner: Transport for NSW
- Operator: Transdev Sydney Ferries
- Platforms: 1 wharf (1 berth)
- Connections: Cremorne Point Wharf, Milson Rd

Construction
- Accessible: Yes

Other information
- Status: Unstaffed

History
- Rebuilt: 5 February 2015

Services
Preceding wharf	Sydney Ferries	Following wharf
Circular Quay Terminus	F6 Mosman Bay	South Mosman towards Mosman Bay
Location

Cremorne Point ferry wharf is located on the northern side of Sydney Harbour serving the North Sydney Council suburb of Cremorne Point on the Lower North Shore. It is served by Sydney Ferries Mosman services operated by First Fleet class ferries.

In June 2007, the wharf sank during a storm. It reopened in September 2007.

On 8 October 2014, the wharf closed for a rebuild. The existing wharf was demolished, with a new one built reopening on 5 February 2015. In 2022, the roof of the wharf was removed by crane due to structural concerns. As of July 2024, it remains this way. On the 26th May 2025 Cremorne Point Wharf temporally closed until the 12th of December 2025 to undergo critical repairs, rebuilding the gangway and a new roof over the pontoon.

== Services ==
Platform	Line	Stopping pattern	Notes
1	Mosman Bay ferry service	Morning weekday shuttle to Mosman Bay; All stops to Mosman Bay; Shuttle to Circular Quay	

== Transport links ==
Keolis Downer Northern Beaches operates one bus route via Cremorne Point wharf, under contract to Transport for NSW:

- 225: to Neutral Bay wharf
