= Mosman Bay ferry wharf =

Sydney Ferries wharf in Mosman

Mosman Bay
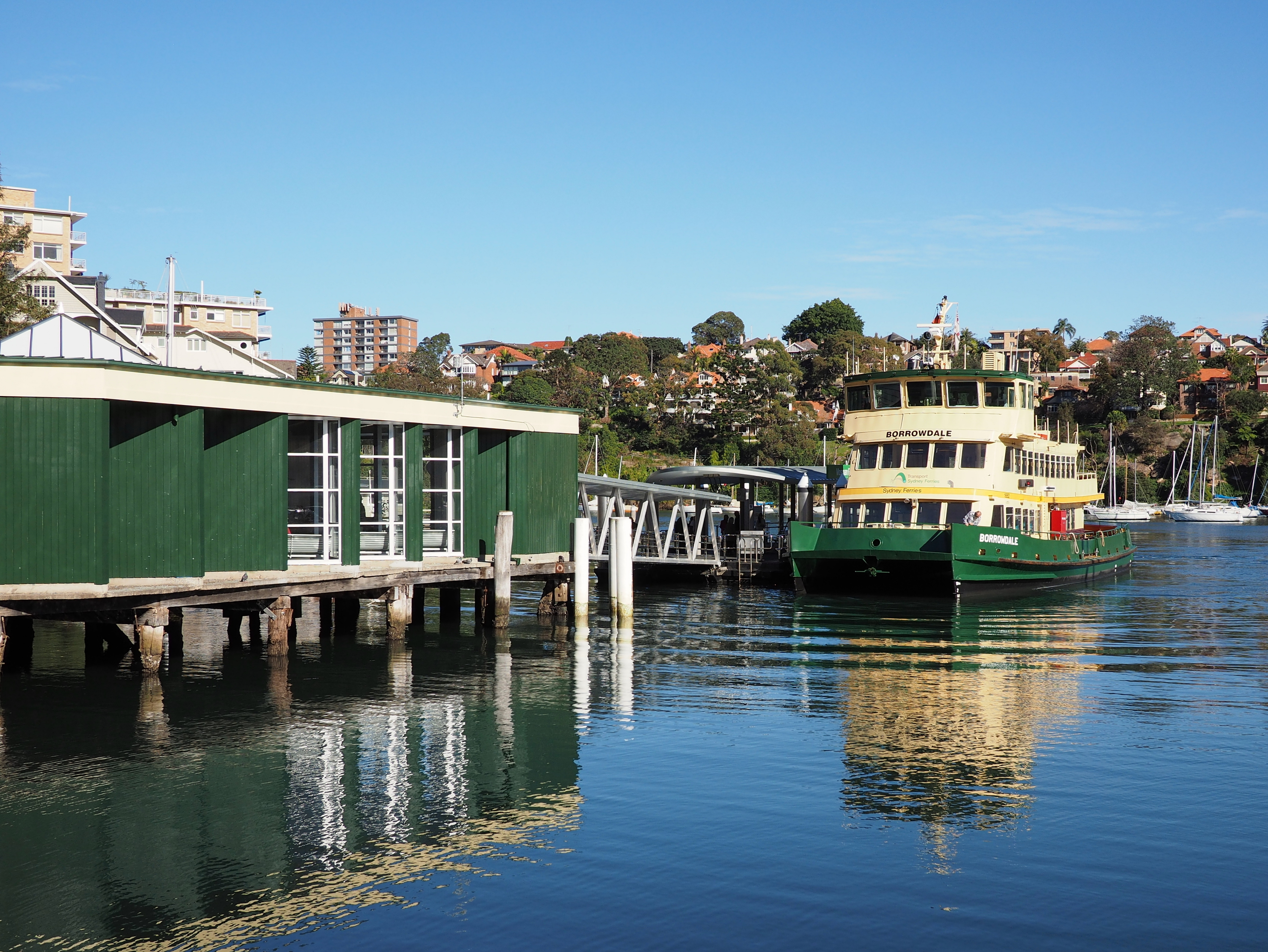
- Borrowdale arriving at Mosman Bay wharf in 2015, showing the 1960s piled structure (left) and the 2014 pontoon (right)

General information
- Location: Avenue Road, Mosman; New South Wales; Australia
- Coordinates: 33°50′18″S 151°13′58″E
- Owner: Transport for NSW
- Operator: Transdev Sydney Ferries
- Platforms: 1 wharf (1 berth)
- Connections: Mosman Bay Wharf, Avenue Rd

Construction
- Accessible: Yes

Other information
- Status: Unstaffed

History
- Opened: Somewhere between 1859 and 1889
- Rebuilt: 1900, 1960s, 2014

Services
Preceding wharf	Sydney Ferries	Following wharf
Old Cremorne towards Circular Quay	F6 Mosman Bay	Terminus
Location

Mosman Bay ferry wharf is located on Mosman Bay on the northern side of Sydney Harbour serving the Lower North Shore suburb of Mosman. It is served by Sydney Ferries Mosman services operated by First Fleet class ferries.

== History ==
The first regular ferry service was arranged by property developer Richard Harnett in the early 1870s. A tram service to the wharf commenced in March 1897. At the same and in anticipation of increased demand from a developing and increasingly prosperous Mosman area, Sydney Ferries Limited improved frequency of ferries from Circular Quay. In addition to Mosman Wharf, ferries on that route serviced Musgrave Street Wharf (now South Mosman) and Cremorne Wharf (renamed Old Cremorne) with the opening of the Cremorne Point wharf and its tram connection in 1911.

In 1900, Sydney Ferries Limited acquired a freehold over then wharf and completed a significant Edwardian-style expansion providing a new wharf, waiting rooms and shops.

In 1961, the pontoon sank, and the in 1960s, the Edwardian wharf was replaced with a modern style structure. On 26 March 2014, the wharf was closed for to replace the pontoon and gangway whilst the existing waterside structure was refurbished.

== Services ==
Platform	Line	Stopping pattern	Notes
1	Mosman Bay ferry service	All stops to Circular Quay; Limited stops to Circular Quay excluding Old Cremorne; Limited stops to Circular Quay excluding Old Cremorne and South Mosman	

== Transport links ==
Keolis Downer Northern Beaches operates one bus route to and from Mosman Bay wharf:

- 230: to Milsons Point
