= South Mosman ferry wharf =

Ferry wharf in Sydney

South Mosman
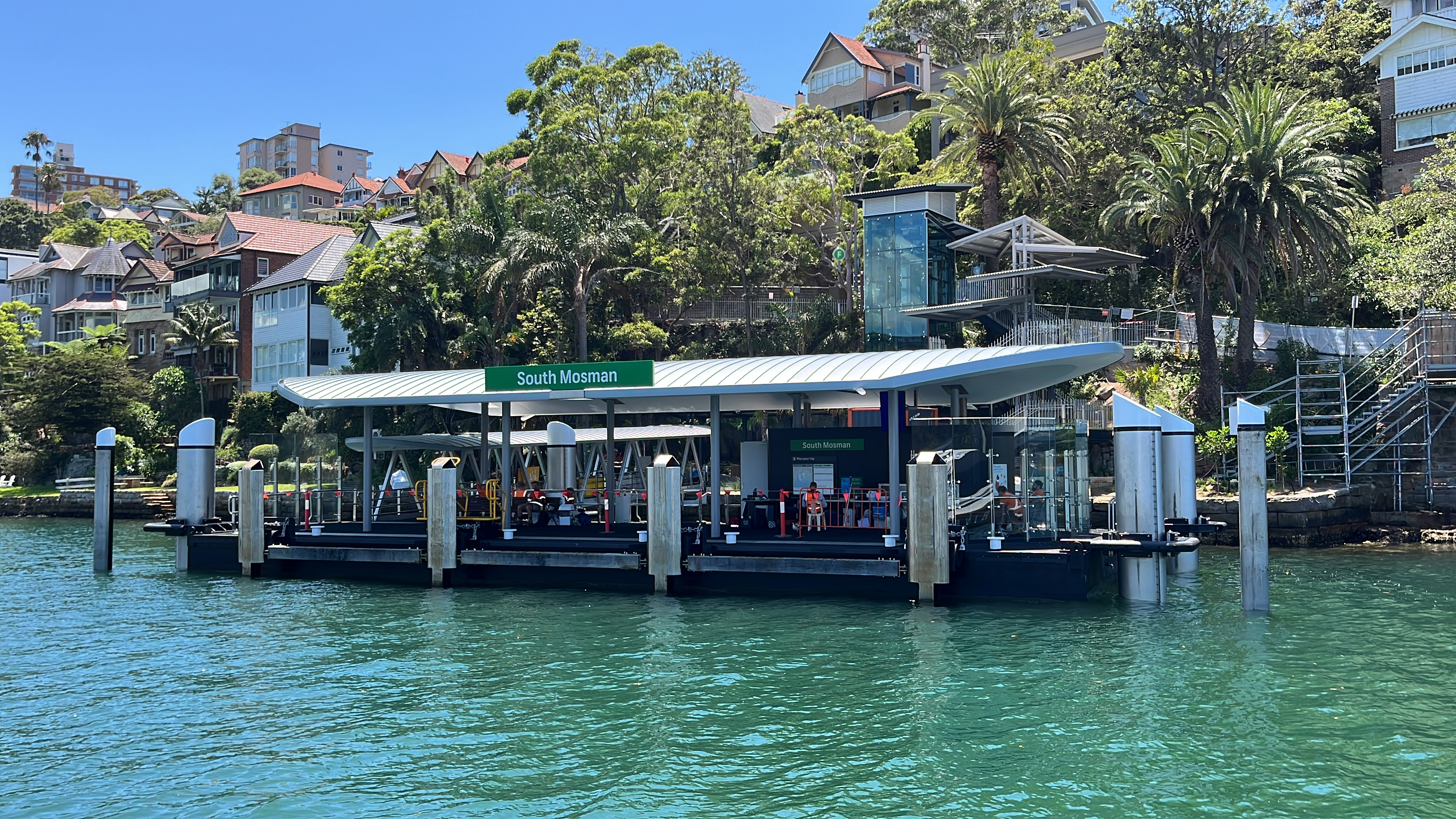
- Wharf in January 2025

General information
- Location: Musgrave Street, Mosman; New South Wales; Australia
- Coordinates: 33.8433°S 151.2326°E
- Owner: Transport for NSW
- Operator: Transdev Sydney Ferries
- Platforms: 1 wharf (1 berth)
- Connections: South Mosman Wharf, Musgrave St

Other information
- Status: Unstaffed

History
- Rebuilt: 3rd of June 2024 to 24th of January 2025
- Former names: Musgrave Street, Mosman (–2002)

Services
Preceding wharf	Sydney Ferries	Following wharf
Cremorne Point towards Circular Quay	F6 Mosman Bay	Old Cremorne towards Mosman Bay
Location

South Mosman ferry wharf is located on the northern side of Sydney Harbour serving the Lower North Shore suburb of Mosman. It is located at the end of Musgrave St, and was known as Musgrave Street Wharf from the 19th century through to the 1990s when the State Government renamed it "Mosman South". Today it is known as South Mosman but many locals still refer to it as Musgrave Street wharf.

From the 3rd of June 2024 to the 24th of January 2025, South Mosman wharf was temporally closed while the wharf was rebuilt to include a new lift, stairs and a new floating pontoon with a covered waiting area.

== Services ==
South Mosman wharf is served by Sydney Ferries Mosman Bay services operated by First Fleet class ferries.

Platform	Line	Stopping pattern	Notes
1	Mosman Bay ferry service	All stops to Mosman Bay; All stops to Circular Quay	

== Historical gallery ==
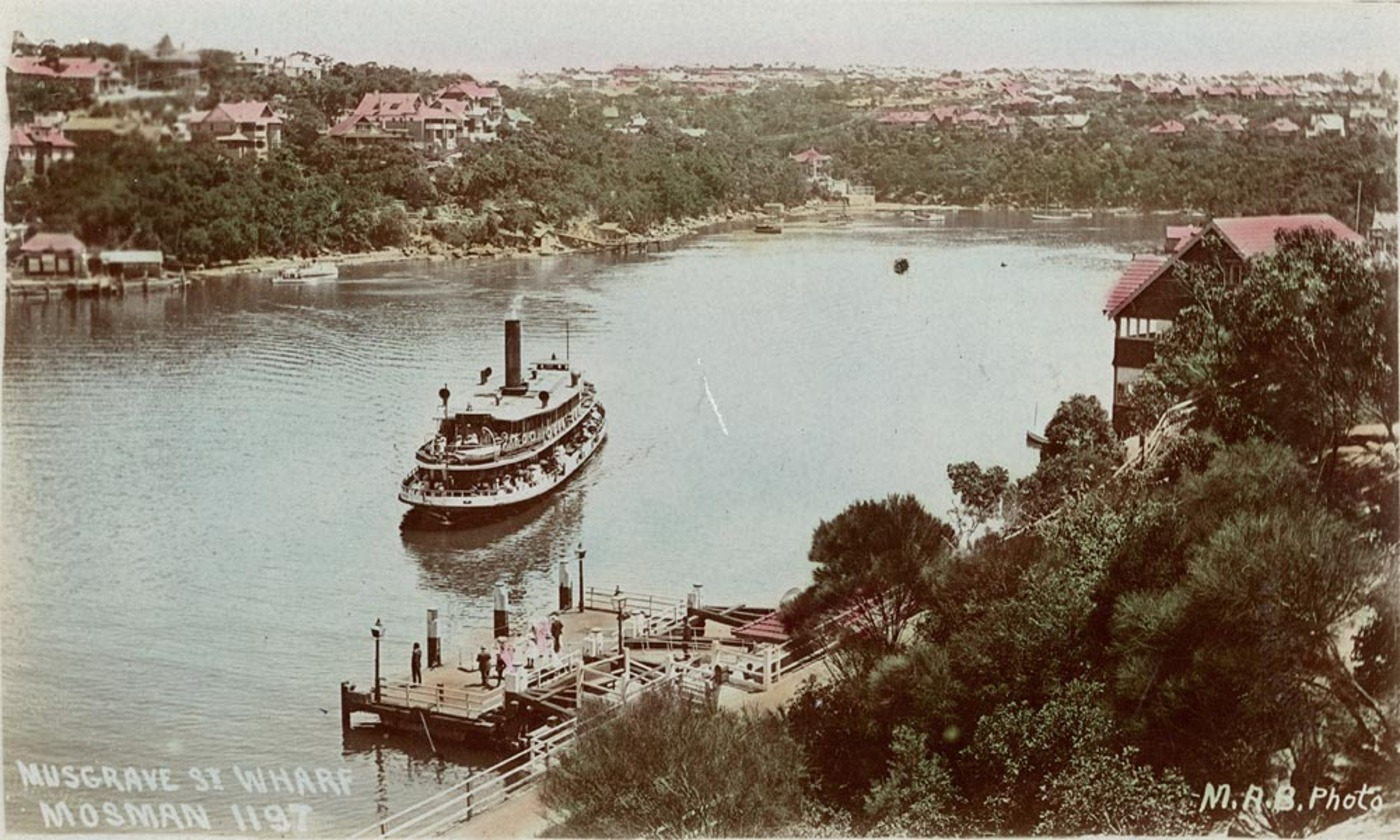

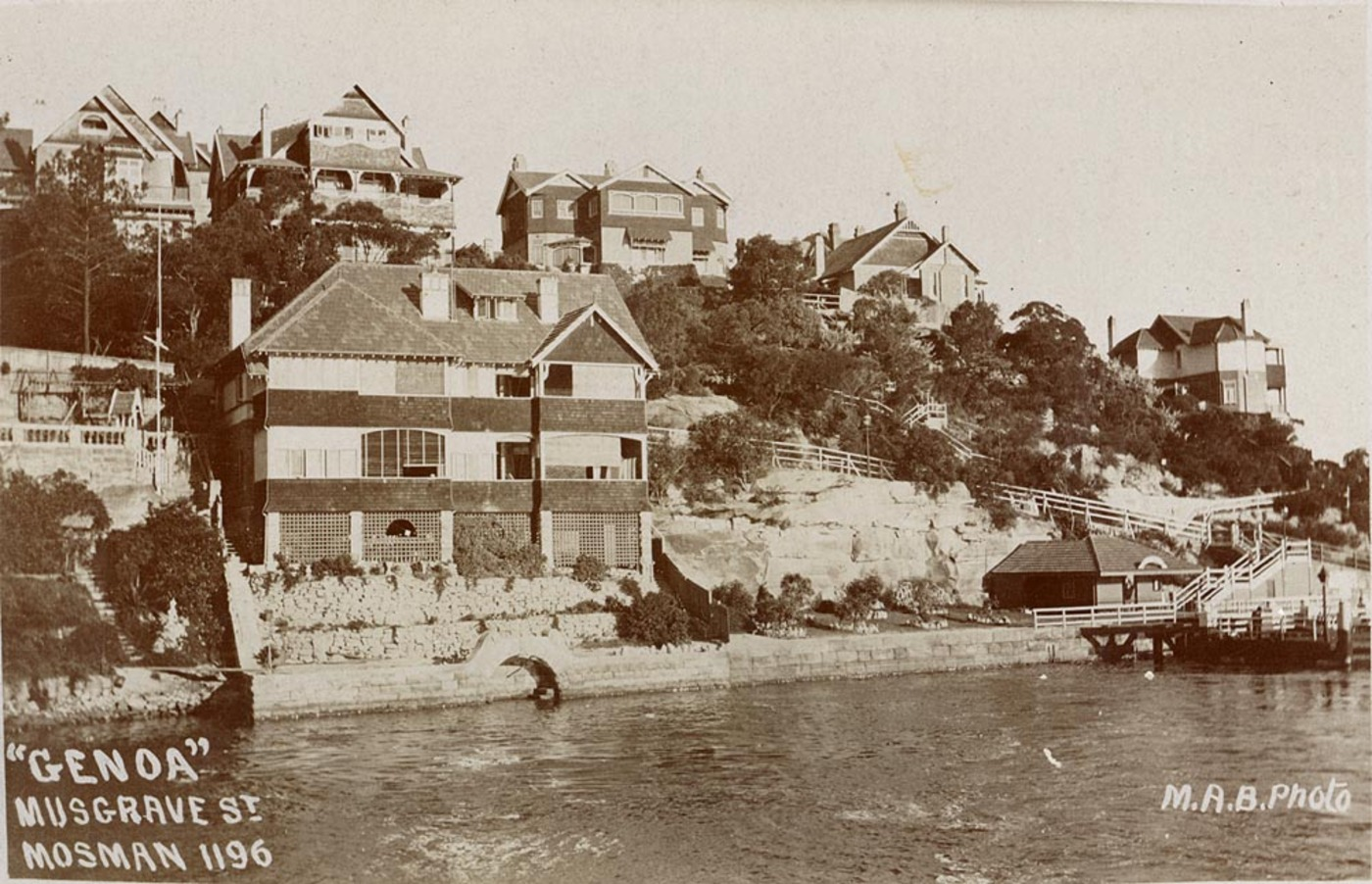
early twentieth century

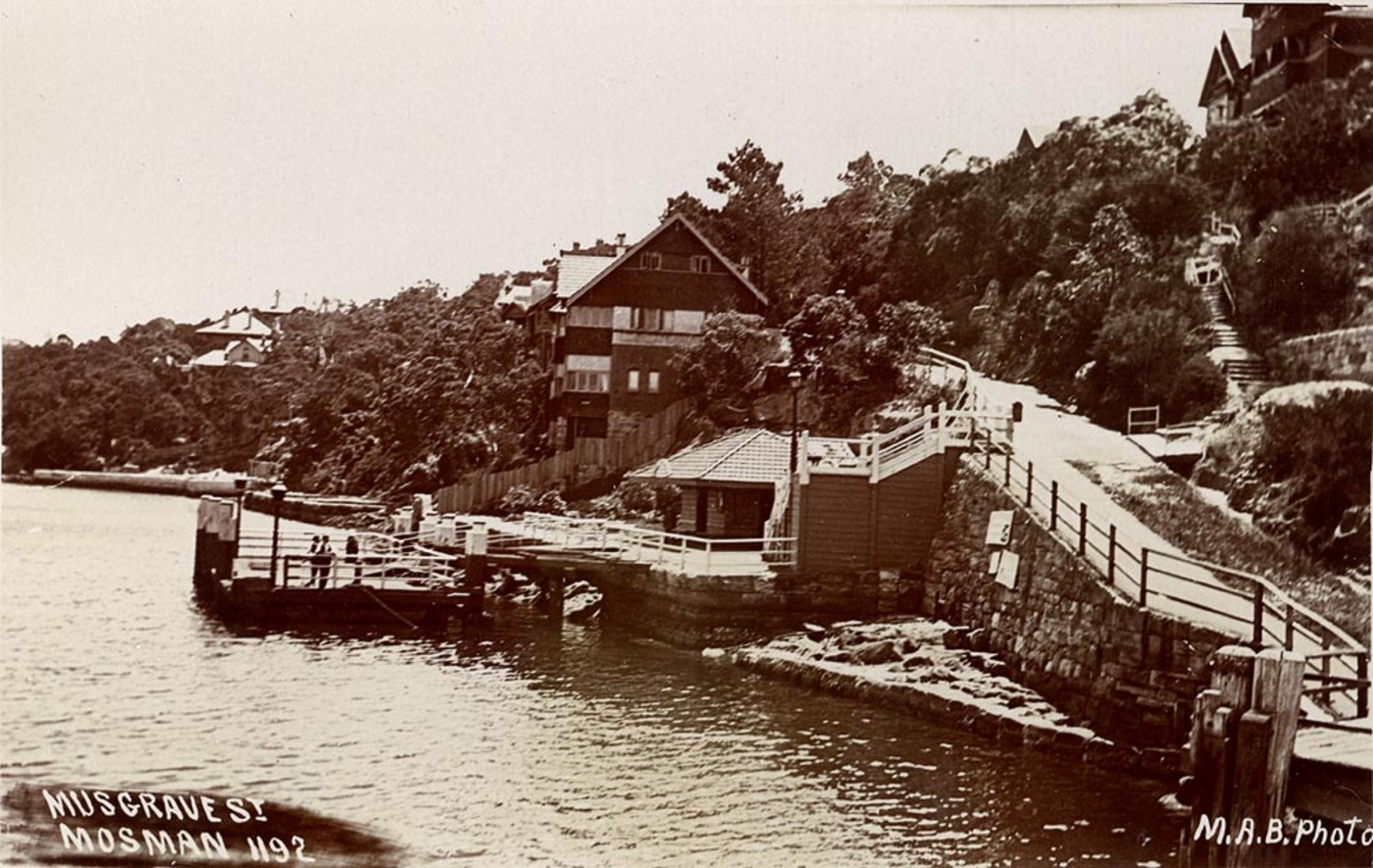
early twentieth century

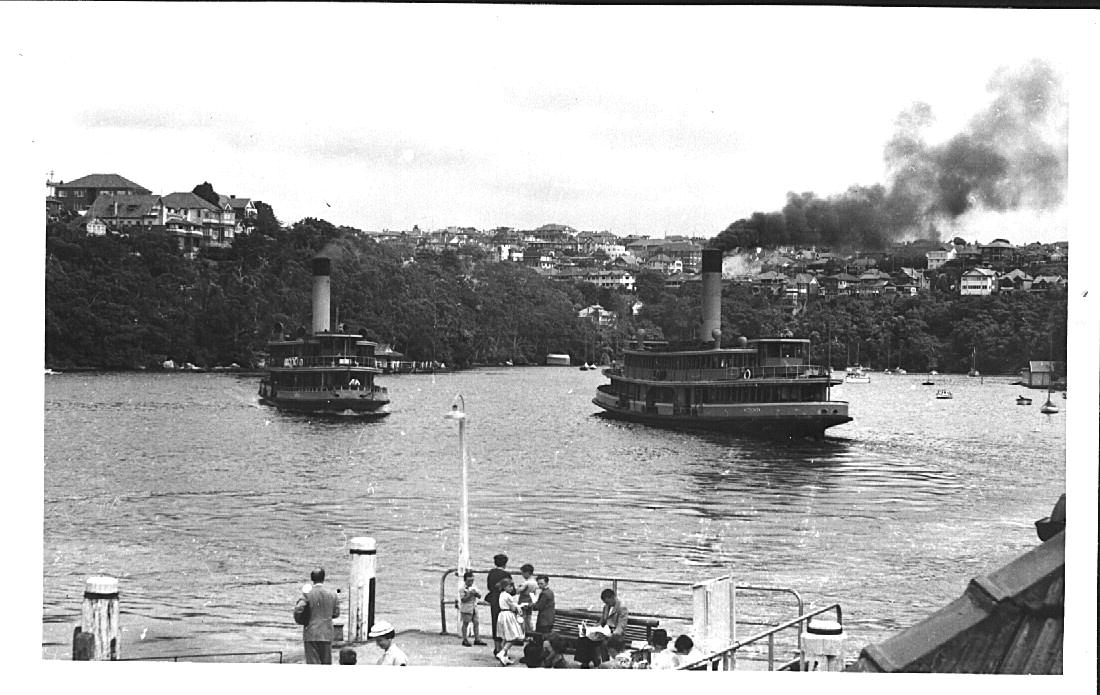
Kubu (left) approaches the wharf as Kanangra leaves, 1950s

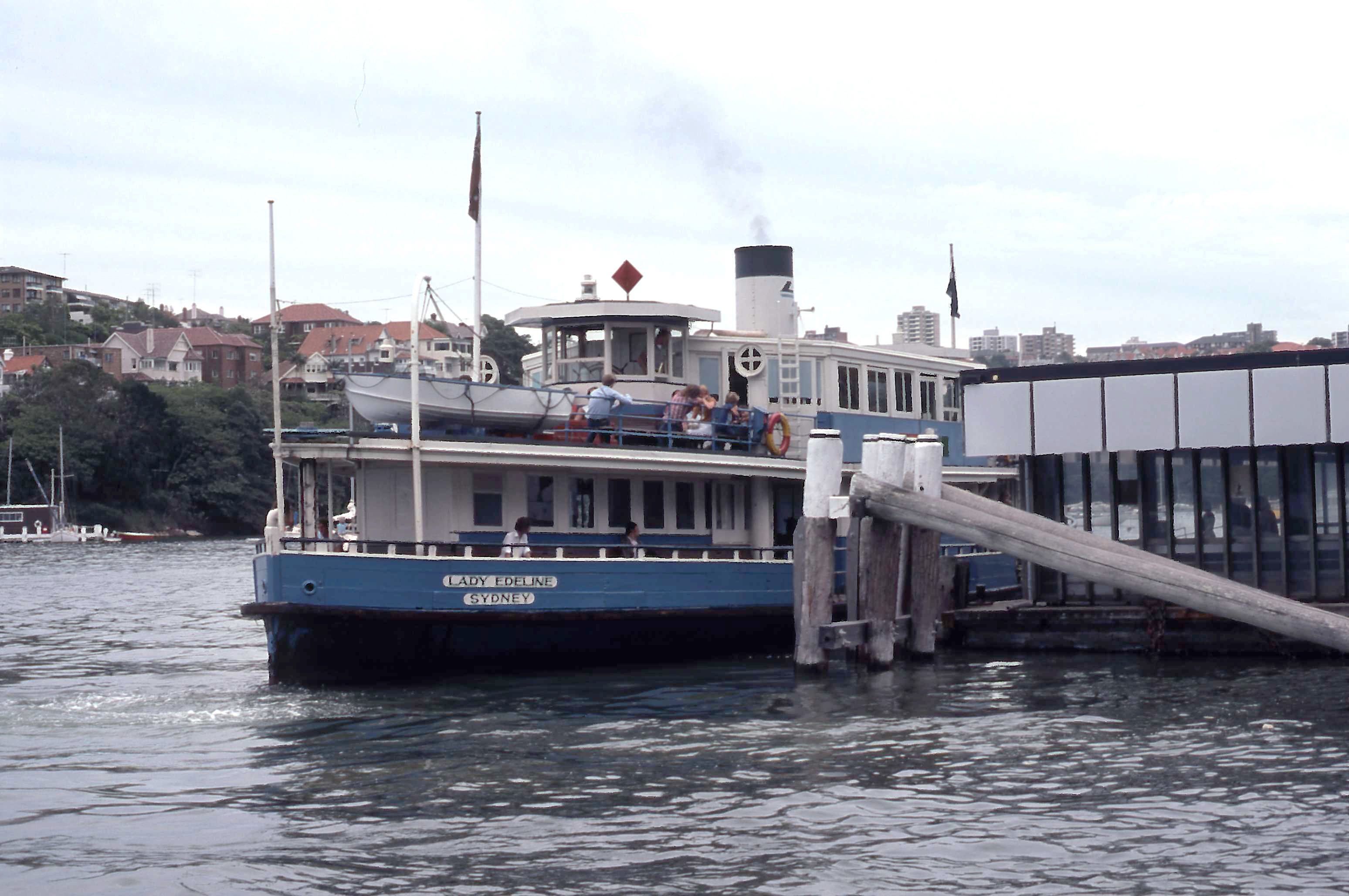
Lady Edeline at the wharf, 1978

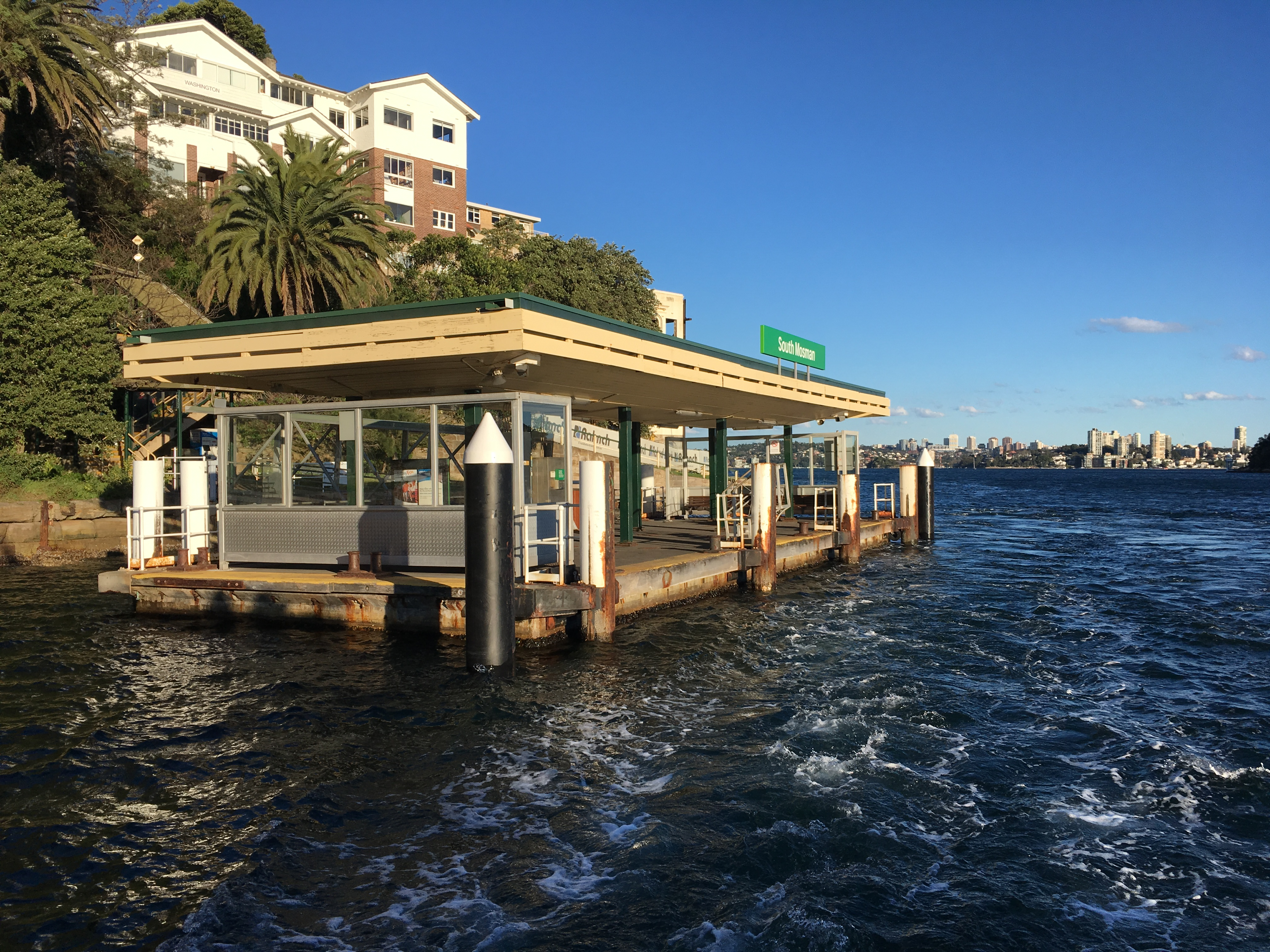
South Mosman ferry wharf in 2017 before being rebuilt
