= Kaikai (ferry) =

Ferry on Sydney Harbour

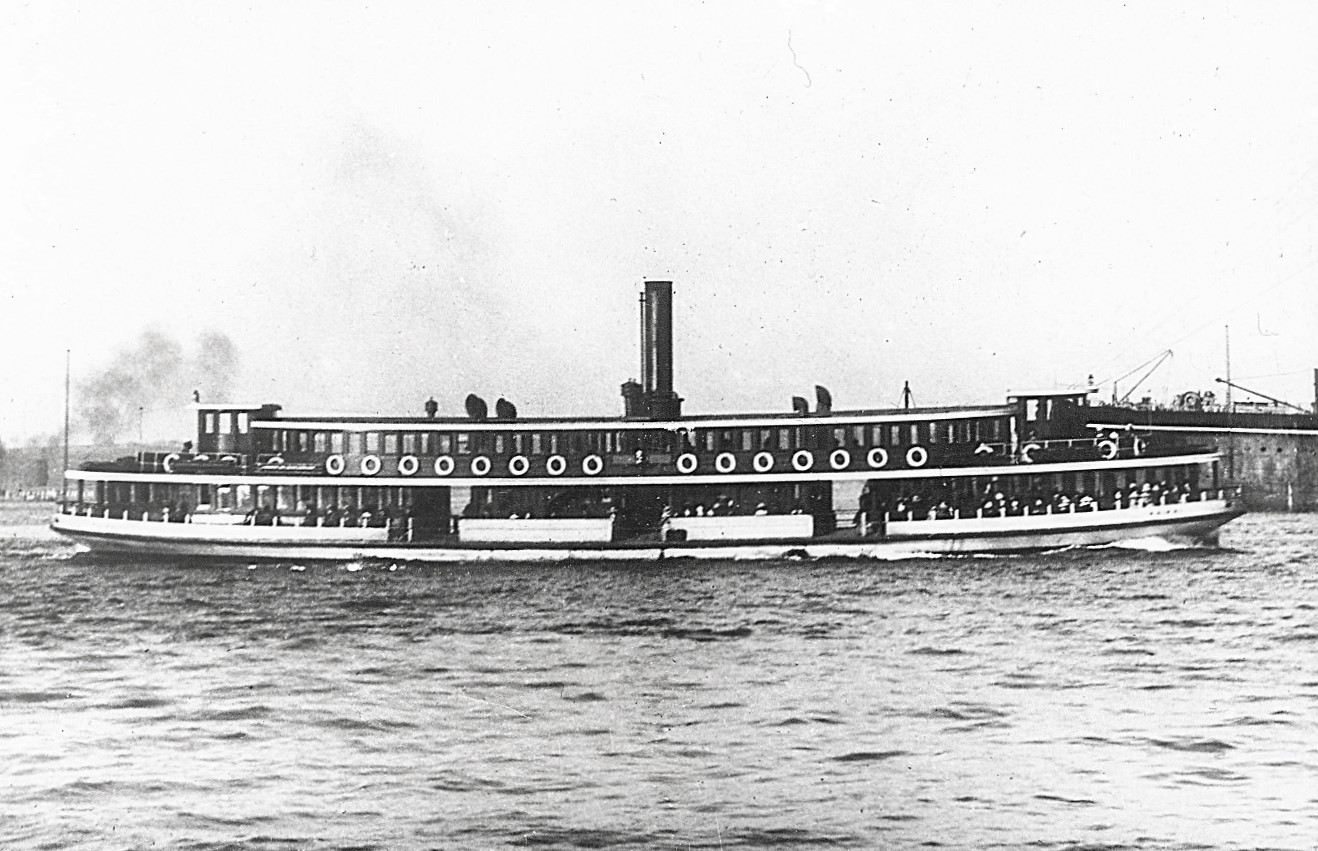
- Kaikai entering Sydney Cove

History
- Name: Kaikai
- Namesake: Australian Indigenous word for 'jewfish' or 'food'
- Operator: Sydney Ferries Limited
- Builder: David Drake Limited, W M Ford Jnr, Balmain
- Cost: £13,575.
- Launched: 1906
- Completed: 1907
- Out of service: 1942?
- Identification: O/N: 121165
- Fate: To Navy 1942, broken up 1947

General characteristics
- Tonnage: 303 tons
- Length: 46.3 m
- Beam: 10.1 m
- Installed power: 59 hp triple expansion steam
- Propulsion: double-ended screw
- Speed: 11.5 knots
- Capacity: 1,245

Kaikai was a "K-class" ferry on Sydney Harbour. Commissioned in 1907, the timber-hulled steamer was built for Sydney Ferries Limited during the boom in cross-harbour ferry travel prior to the 1932 opening of the Sydney Harbour Bridge. At the time of launch, Kaikai was one of Sydney's largest wooden ferries, being the longest and second largest by tonnage. She was a typical example of the "K-class"; a group of double-deck, double-ended, steam-powered screw ferries.

Kaikai was built for the short but busy cross-harbour route between Circular Quay and Milsons Point. She survived the 1932 opening of the Sydney Harbour Bridge (17 other Sydney Ferries Limited vessels were sold at the time). She was taken over by the Royal Australian Navy in 1942 and sold for breaking up in 1947.

Kaikai followed Sydney Ferries Limited's tradition of naming their vessels after Australian Indigenous words starting with "K". "Kaikai" is thought to be an indigenous word for 'food' or 'jewfish'.

== Background ==
Kaikai was built for Sydney Ferries Limited during the early twentieth century boom in cross-Harbour travel prior to the 1932 opening of the Sydney Harbour Bridge. She was typical of a broader type of timber double-ended screw ferry known as the K-class. The company built 25 of these vessels between the 1890s and early 1920s to meet the booming demand. The K-class were all propelled by triple expansion steam engines and were predominantly timber-hulled (four later K-class had steel hulls).

== Design and construction ==
Kaikai's design was an evolution of Sydney Ferries Limited's K-class design. The hull and deck fittings were designed by J Barber, foreman joiner of Sydney Ferries Limited, under the supervision of, and to a specification by T. Brown, works manager. She followed Kareela (1905) in being the second such ferry to have rounded roofline returns into her wheelhouses, thus fully enclosing the ends of the upper decks. While upper decks had been enclosed since the 1902's Koree, she and previous K-class steamers (Kurraba (1899), Kirribilli (1900), Kummulla (1903), and Kulgoa (1905)) all had open ended upper decks.

She was built by David Drake Limited, Balmain for £13,575. Her keel and keelson were made of ironbark, and at the time of her launch, it was noted to be specially strengthened throughout, with 14 x 14 inch hardwood belting running around the vessel. The floors and frames were of hardwood with the bottom planking also of hardwood throughout, and copper-fastened up to the waterline. She had four wooden bulkheads and one iron bulkhead. The hull was flared out with no overhanging sponsons, with a 4 inch x 1 inch iron sponson band.

Her 59 hp triple expansion steam engine and boilers were supplied by Mort's Dock & Engineering Company to a specification provided by Sydney Ferries Limited works manager, Mr. T Brown. Of direct action, surface condensing type, her engines had cylinders of 13-inch, 21-inch, and 34-inch diameters respectively, with a stroke length of 21 inches. Her two through multi-tubular cylindrical type boilers were both 2.18 m in diameter, 4.6 m in length, and carried a working pressure of 180 1b, with a total heating space of 93 m2. The boilers were fitted with Deightons patent suspension furnace and automatic pumps as well as a fuel heater. She was fitted with a combined steam and hand steering gear from Alley and McClelland's. Electric lights, still a relative recent innovation for ferries, were supplied by Aller and McLellan of Glasgow and fitted Scott Henderson and Co.

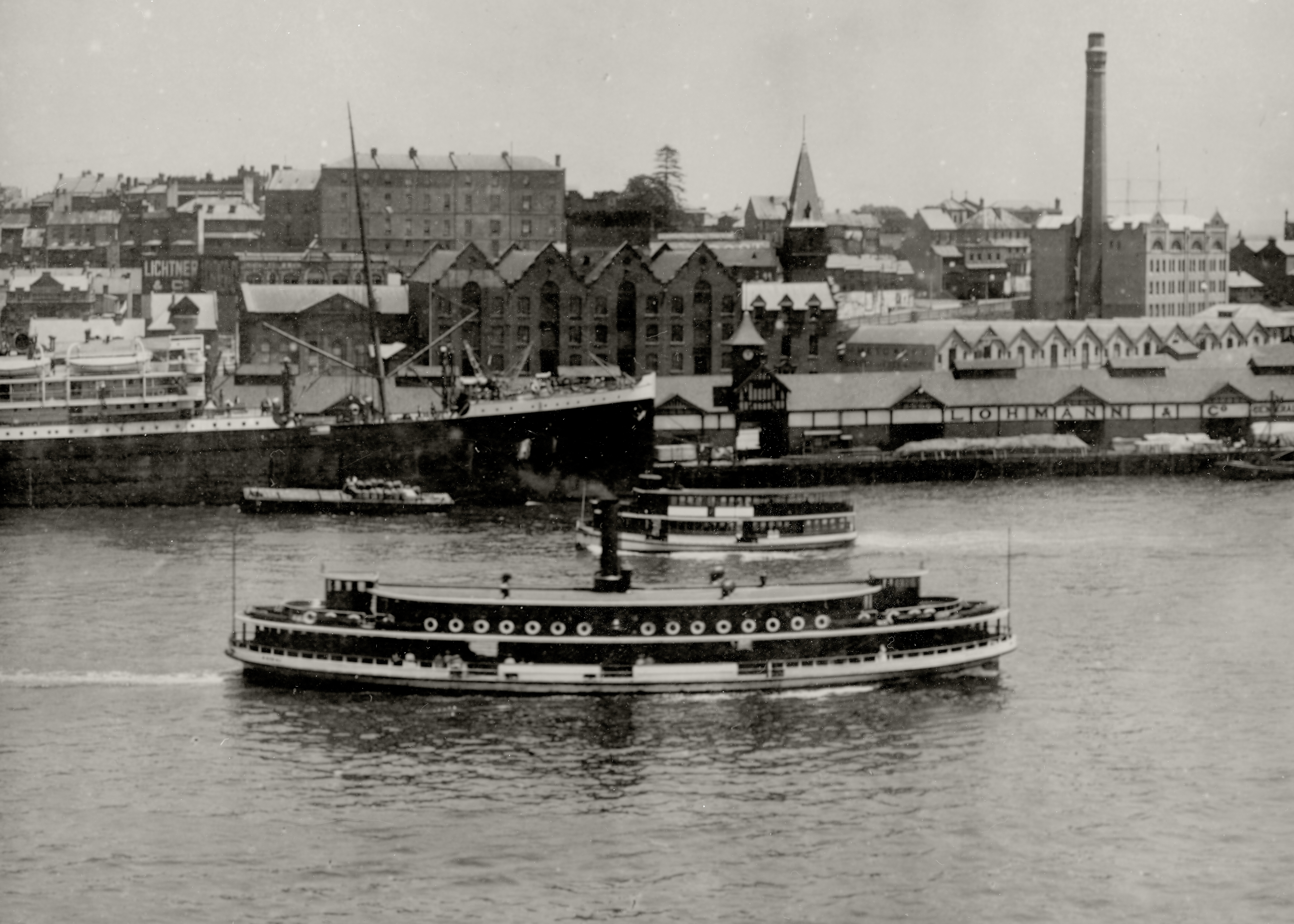
Kaikai as built and in her original white trim, 1910

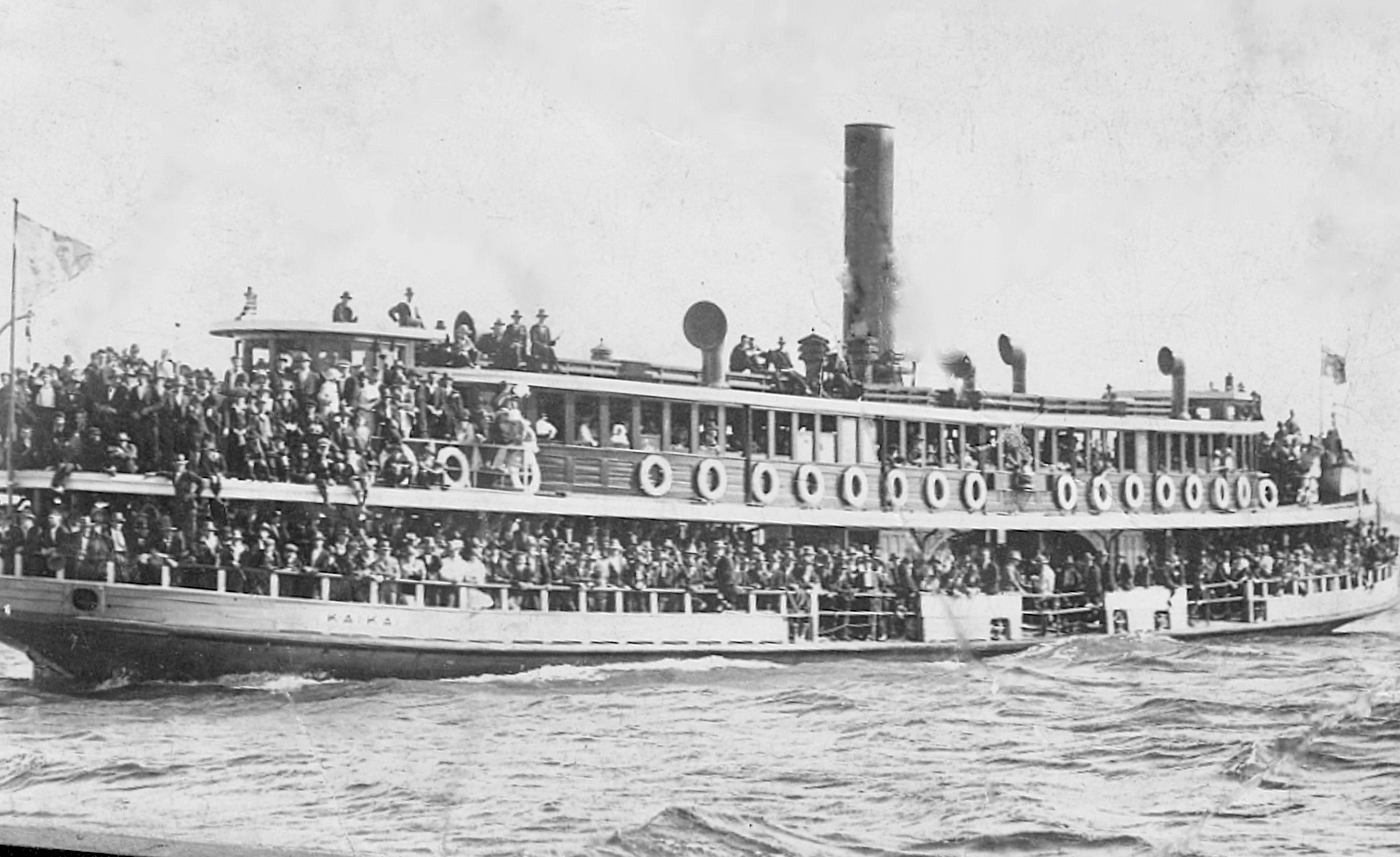
A full Kaikai possibly on an excursion/spectator trip

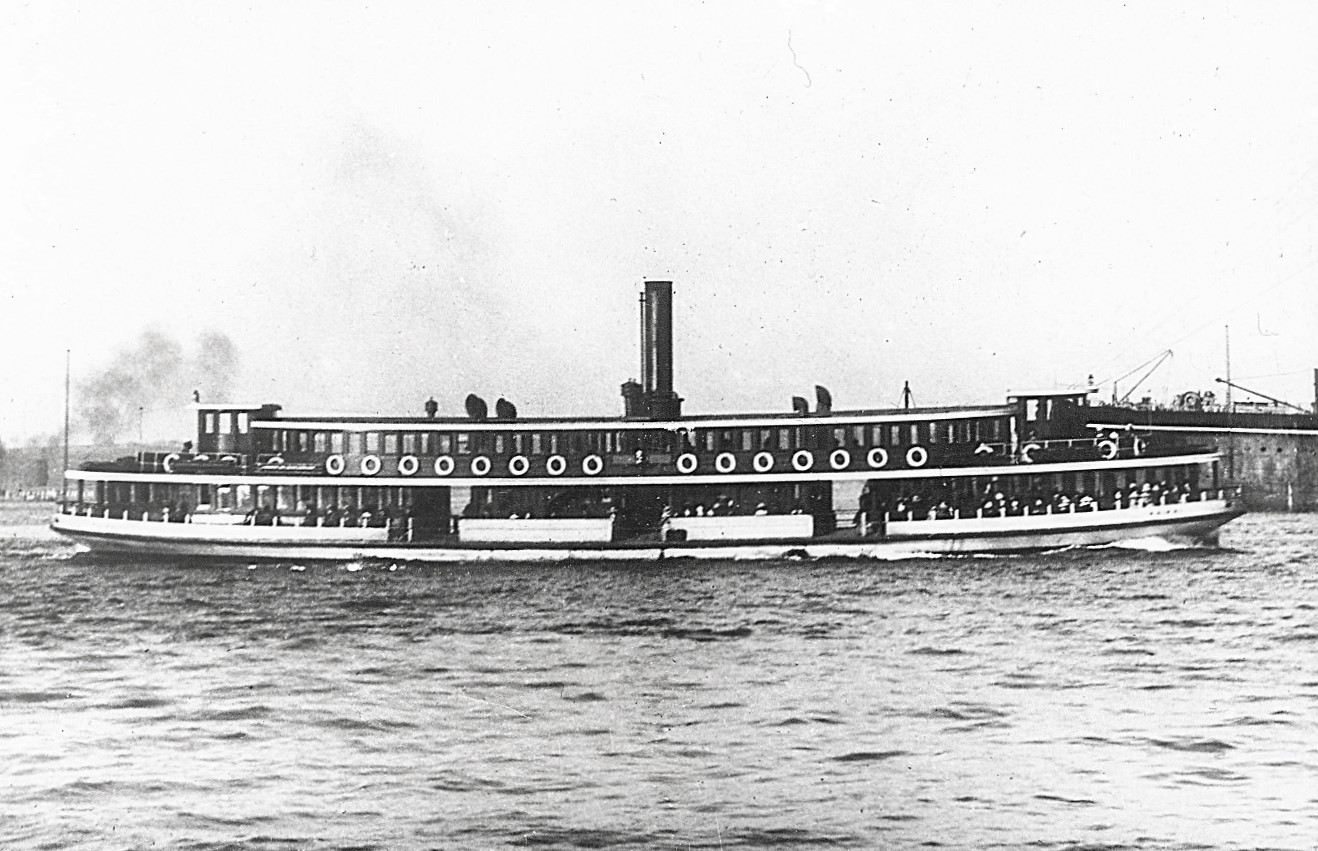
Kaikai as built

When new, she was the longest of the Sydney Ferries Ltd fleet (and second largest by tonnage). A new pontoon was built at Circular Quay to accommodate her. Her 46.3 m length was significantly longer than the next largest ferry, Kulgoa's, (42.7 m) and her beam was 10.1 m compared to Kulgoa's 9.6 m. While her tonnage was smaller than Kulgoa's (303 tons vs 338 tons), her rated passenger capacity of 1,250 was similar to Kulgoa's 1,255.

Kaikai was launched on 7 November 1906, and christened by Miss Nina Massic, eldest daughter of H H Massie and granddaughter of J A Dibbs. She was the eighth Sydney Ferries Limited vessel to use Indigenous names starting with 'K'. Kookooburra also under construction at the time of Kaikai's launch would be the ninth such vessel. She reached 11.5 knots on her trials on 13 March 1907 which made her the fastest boat in the Sydney Ferries fleet.

== Service history ==
An important event in the history of the ferry traffic of Port Jackson was celebrated yesterday afternoon, when the new steamer Kaikai, the largest and best appointed and, equipped ferry steamer yet built for the Sydney Ferries, Limited, was taken on her official speed trials.

— Report in the Sydney Morning Herald on Kaikai's trials.

Kaikai began service on Saturday 23 March 1907 on the Milsons Point run.

Following the opening of the Bridge, Sydney Ferries Limited patronage fell from a 1927 peak of 47 million annually to 15 million in 1933. The Milsons Point service, which crossed the harbour at the location of the new bridge, was quickly redundant. 17 vessels from the fleet were retired from service, including K-class ferries of similar age Koree, Kummulla, Kurraba and Kirribilli. Kaikai, however, remained in service. With the Milsons Point and Lavender Bay routes discontinued following the bridge opening, she was used on other routes and for charter and concert events. She was modified with a flying bridge to provide her master with greater visibility in order to follow yacht races.

She was taken over by the Navy in 1942 for use as accommodation ship as part of the War effort. She was purchased by the Navy in 1943 and register closed on 10 March of that year. Following the War, she was sold for breaking up 1947.

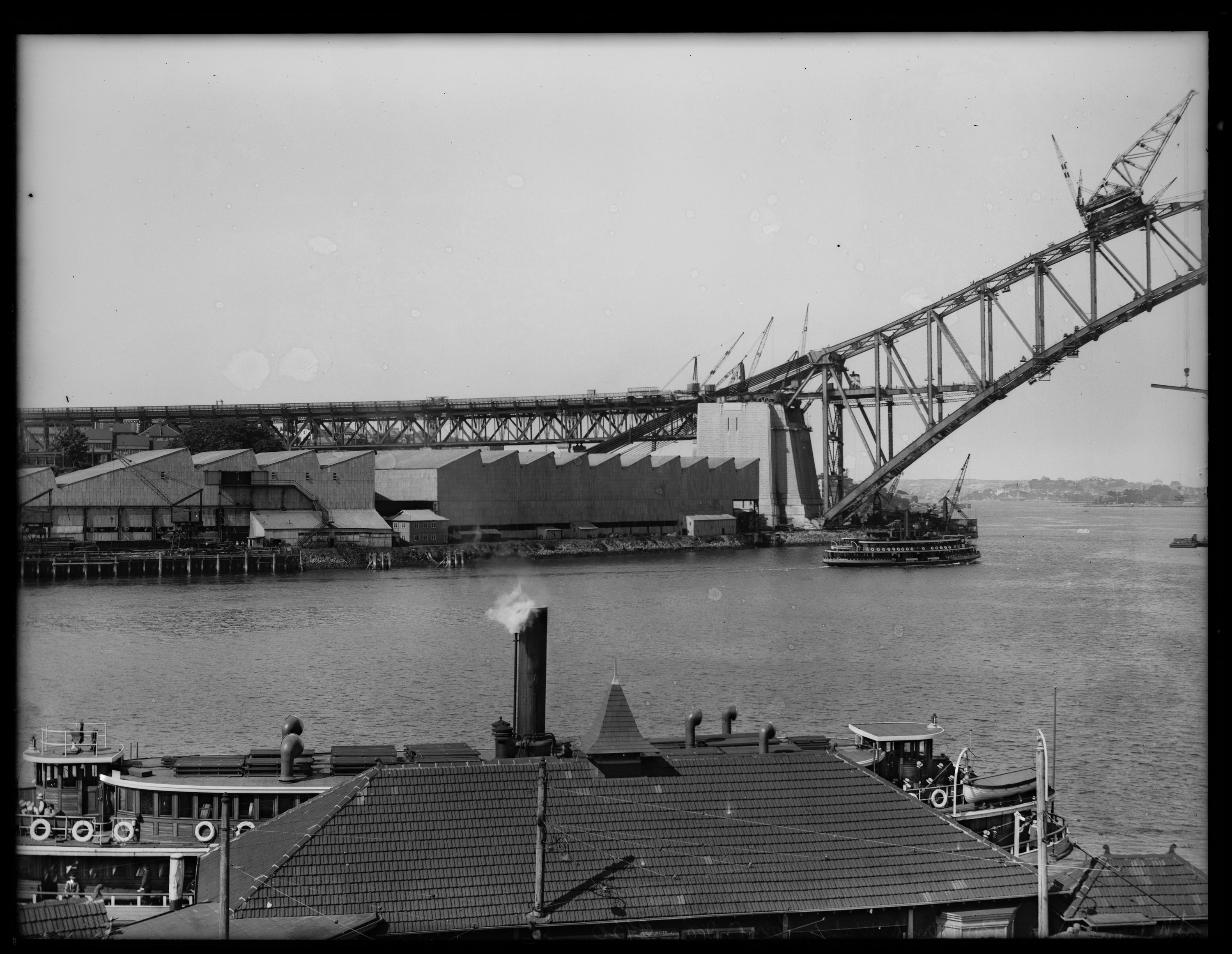
Kaikai (near) at Lavender Bay showing her added flying bridge

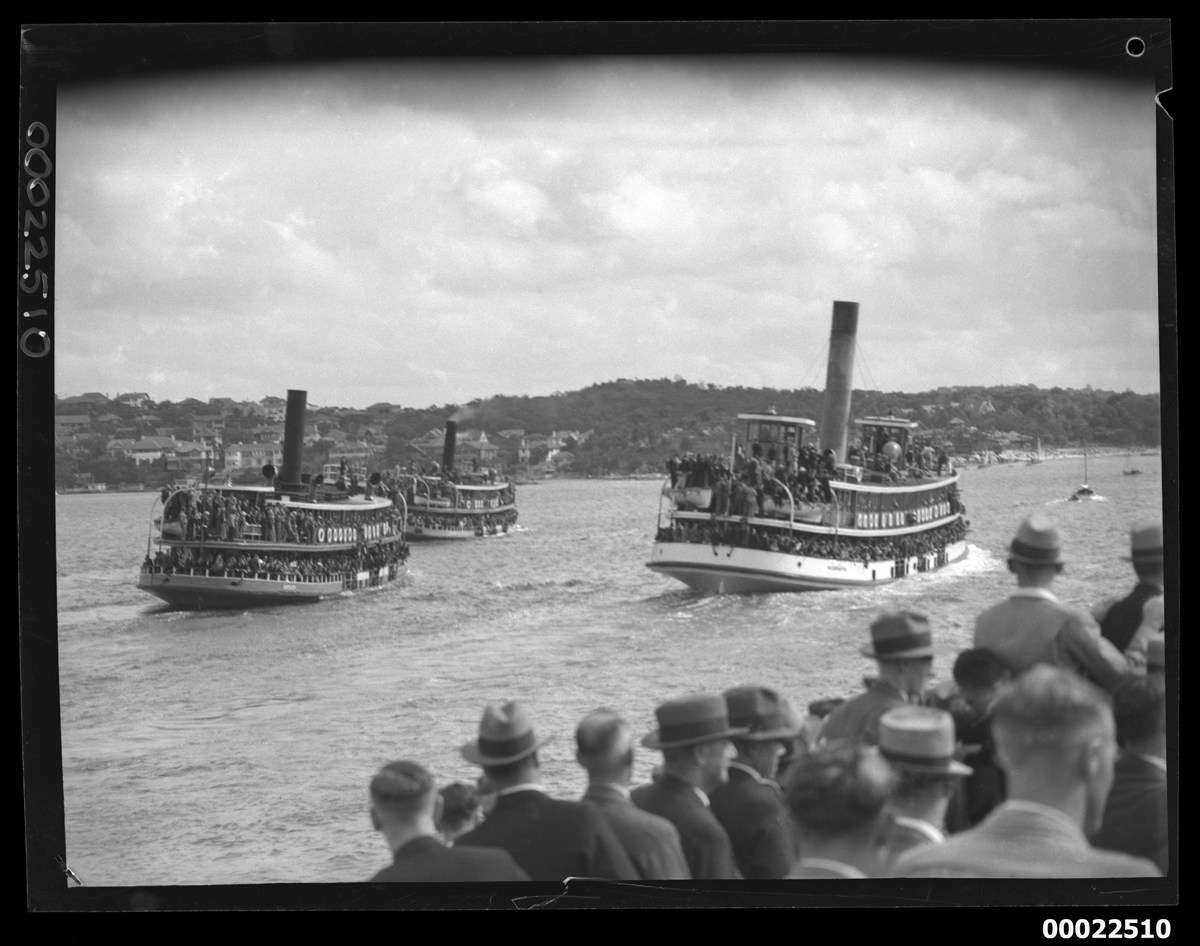
Kaikai (left) following the sailing races with Kulgoa (middle) and Koompartoo (right), late 1930s

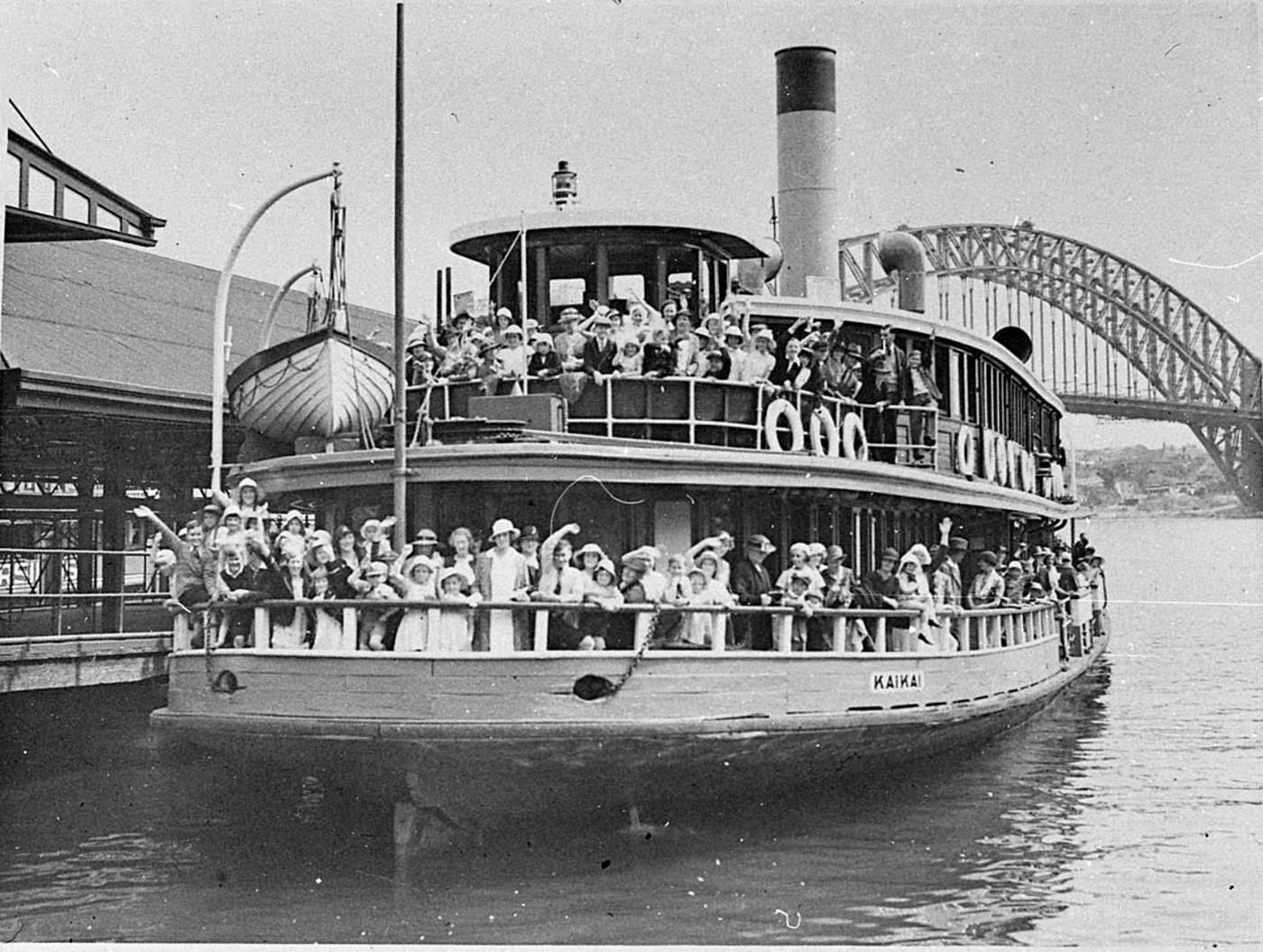
At Circular Quay in her post Bridge colours including cream funnel.

== Incidents ==
- 19 August 1909 – Kulgoa and Kaikai, the two largest inner harbour ferries at the time, collided in Sydney Cove on a foggy morning. The full Kaikai rode higher than the almost empty Kulgoa, ripping out the bulwarks of the latter. No injuries were reported.
- 25 October 1911 – On a Wednesday evening, Kaikai collided with the 'sixty-miler' collier Derwent which severely smashed the ladies saloon panelling and windows. Kaikai had left Milsons Point for Circular Quay at 7:45 pm with about 300 passengers on board when the Derwent struck the ferry's port side. The crew began preparations for possible sinking and evacuation, however, it was found that damaged was limited to above the waterline. Kaikai suffered a nine-foot long rent in her side and the Derwent's bow had penetrated about four feet into the ferry's hull. Her passengers were transferred to Kulgoa and No injuries were reported. A November 1911 Marine Court of Enquiry found that the master of the Derwent to be at fault and suspended his certificate for four months.
- 28 January 1915 – A man fell overboard and was rescued by the crew of the Sydney Ferries Ltd launch, Nautilus.
- Late June 1915 – Kaikai collided with fellow Sydney Ferry Limited ferry Koree at Circular Quay. Kaikai lost a section of her bulwarks and Koree lost her lifeboat. There were no injuries to passengers or crew.
- 1 August 1923 – Kaikai collided with a punt ripping out over 10 feet of bulwarks. No injuries were reported.
- In 1926, Koompartoo collided with Kaikai in thick fog severely damaging the latter. Passengers on Kaikai's lower deck scrambled clear just in time. Kaikai's bow was stove in, and her bulwarks and sponson were crumbled. The forward upper and lower decks were also stoved in with the ladies cabin and steering gear damaged. Damage to Kaikai was estimated at £300 to £400. Koompartoo, being built of steel, was not significantly damaged. While there was great excitement on both ferries, there was no panic or injuries.
- 13 August 1930 – Kaikai collided with Kulgoa then a moment later with Kirrule off Milsons Point. No-one was injured, but about 10 metres of bulwark was stripped off Kulgoa.
- 27 February 1932 – Kaikai struck the tug Leveret when avoiding liner Aorangi. in the mix up, ferry Kamiri then bumped into Kaikai. Leveret and Kamiri were not significantly damaged, while Kaikai suffered splintered timbers.
- 26 May 1933 – Kaikai was struck by Manly ferry Bellubera near Circular Quay on a trip to Cremorne. Slight damage was done to the sponson and bulwarks of Kaikai and steel Bellubera was slightly dented. There were no injuries.
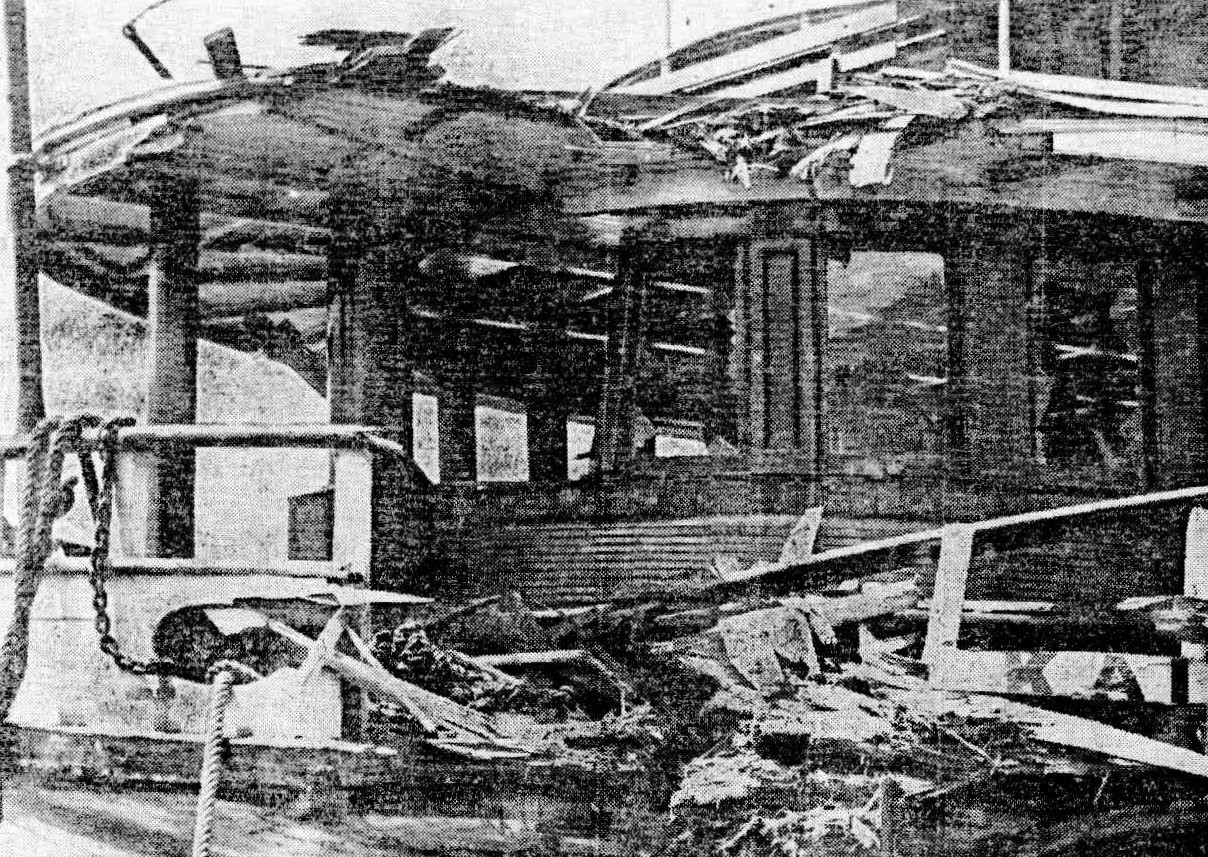
Damage to Kaikai's bow after collision with collier Derwent, 1911

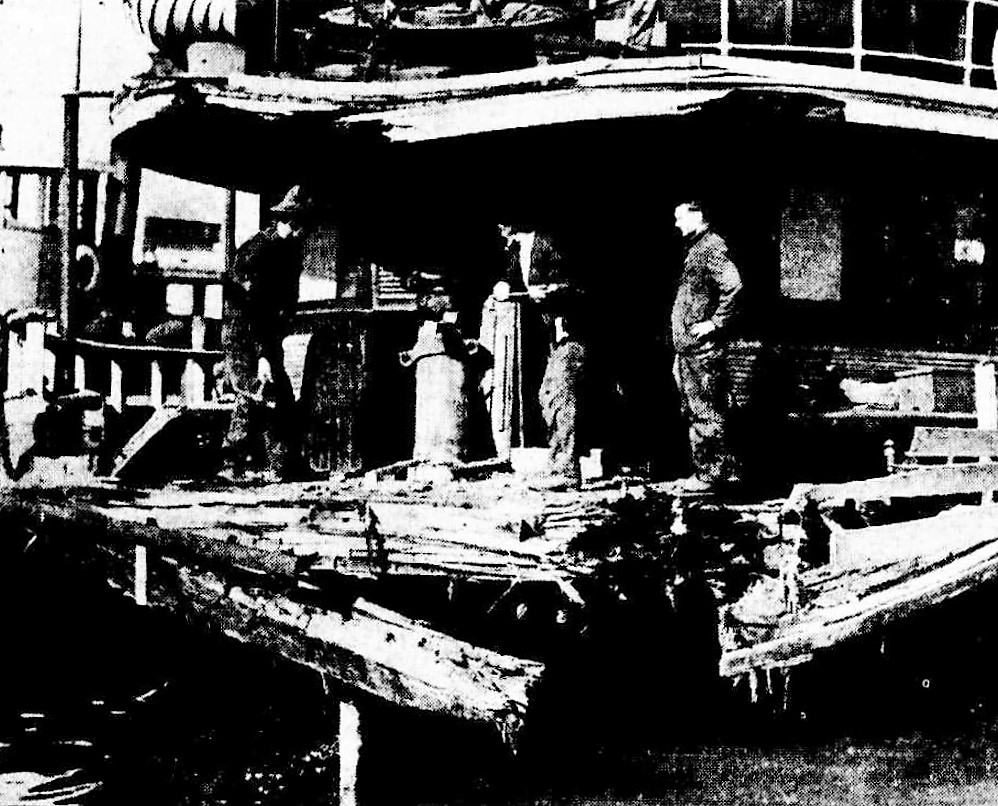
Damage after collision with Koompartoo, 1926

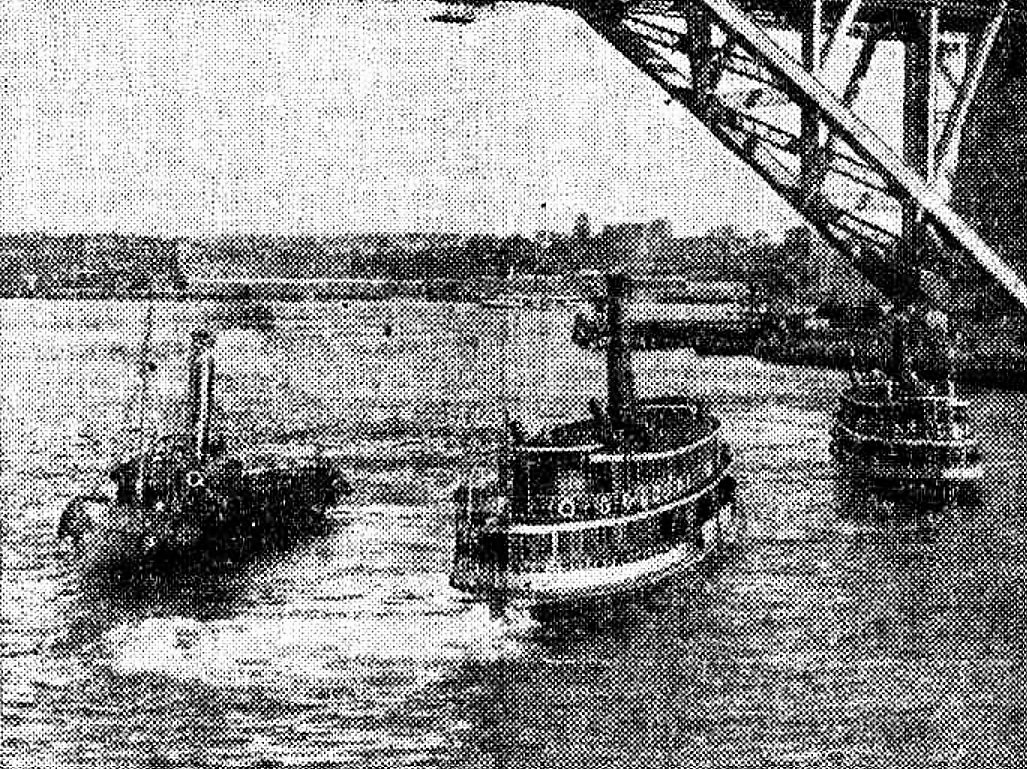
Kaikai (middle) after colliding with tug Leveret (left) and then being struck by fellow ferry Kamiri, 1932

== See also ==
- List of Sydney Harbour ferries
- Timeline of Sydney Harbour ferries
- Sydney K-class ferries
