= Kanimbla (ferry) =

Australian K-class ferry

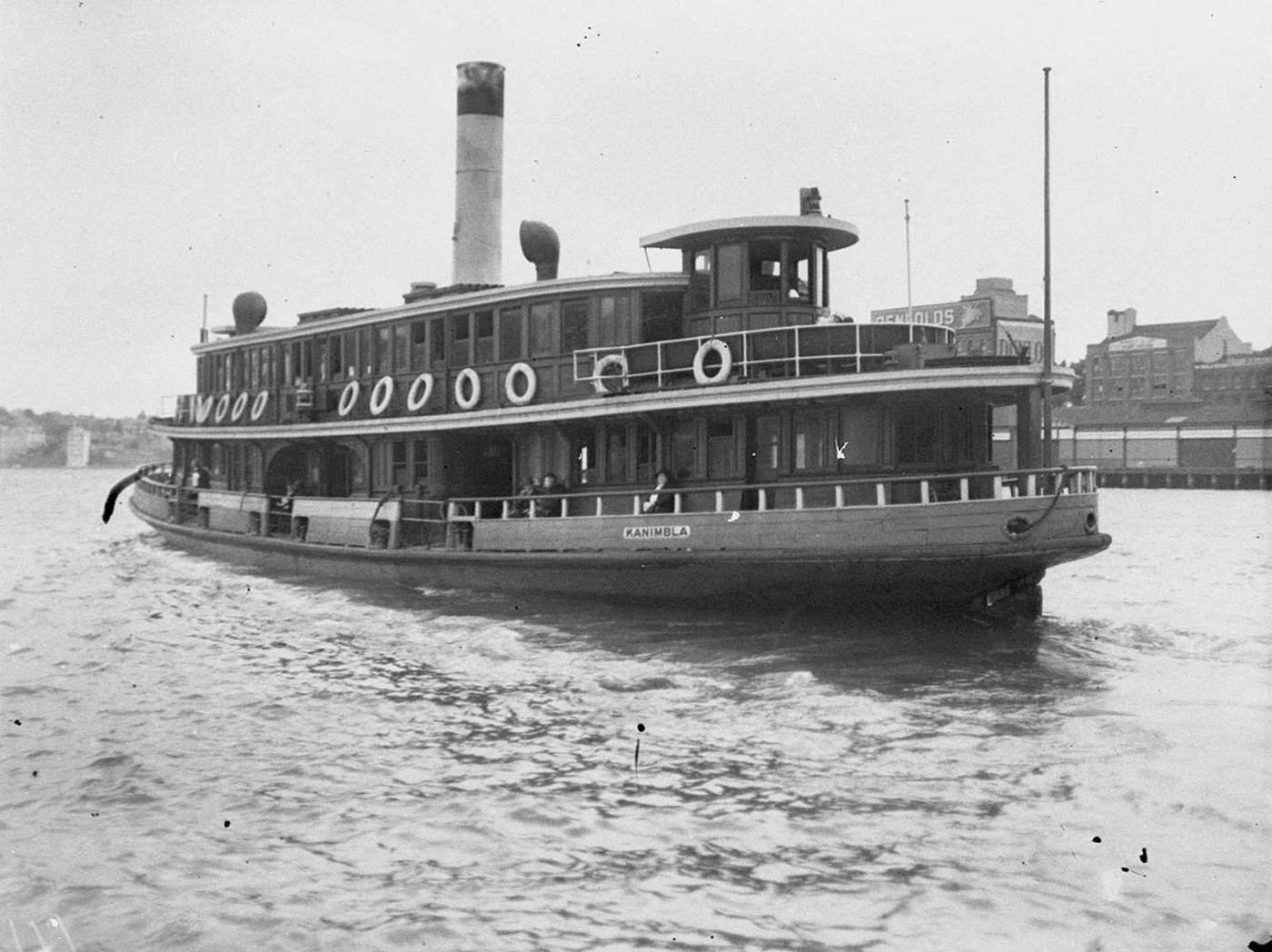
- Kanimbla leaving Circular Quay circa 1934

History
- Name: Kanimbla (later Kurra-Ba)
- Operator: Sydney Ferries Limited
- Builder: Morrison & Sinclair (Kanimbla)
- Cost: £12,489
- Launched: 1910
- Out of service: 1940s
- Fate: Broken up 1950s

General characteristics
- Tonnage: 156
- Length: 34.1m
- Speed: 11 knots
- Capacity: 791

Kanimbla (later Kurra-Ba) was a "K-class" ferry on Sydney Harbour. Launched in 1910, the timber-hulled steamer was built for Sydney Ferries Limited during the boom in cross-harbour ferry travel prior to the opening of the Sydney Harbour Bridge. Kanimbla was renamed "Kurra-Ba" in 1935. She was laid up in the 1940s and broken up in the 1950s.

She was very similar to Kosciusko (1911), and although built by different builders, the two ferries often considered sister ships.

"Kanimbla" has an Aboriginal etymology. According to Meston, Kanimbla derives from the dialect of the "Kurig-gai" tribe of NSW with a meaning of "hidden valley". According to the Naval Historical Society of Australia, kanimbla derives from an Aboriginal word meaning "fighting ground", but the source is uncited.

== Background ==
Kanimbla was built for Sydney Ferries Limited during the early twentieth century boom in cross-Harbour travel prior to the 1932 opening of the Sydney Harbour Bridge. At the time, the company ran one of the largest ferry fleets in the world. The ferry was part of broader type of around 20 double-ended timber screw ferries the Sydney K-class ferries that the company commissioned between the 1890s and early 1920s to meet the booming demand.

Kanimbla followed the Sydney Ferries Limited tradition of naming their vessels after Australian Aboriginal words starting with "K".

== Design and construction ==
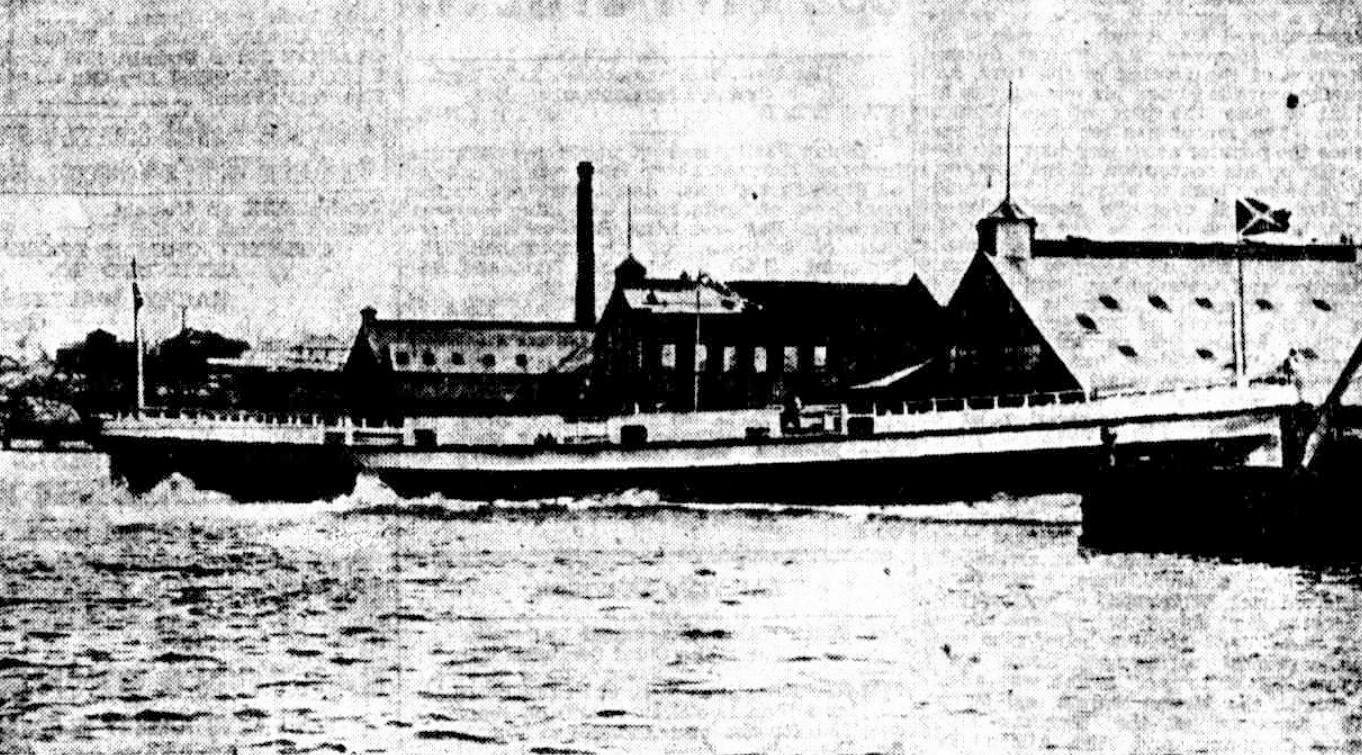
Kanimbla launch day, 2 September 1909, at Morrison & Sinclair yards in Balmain

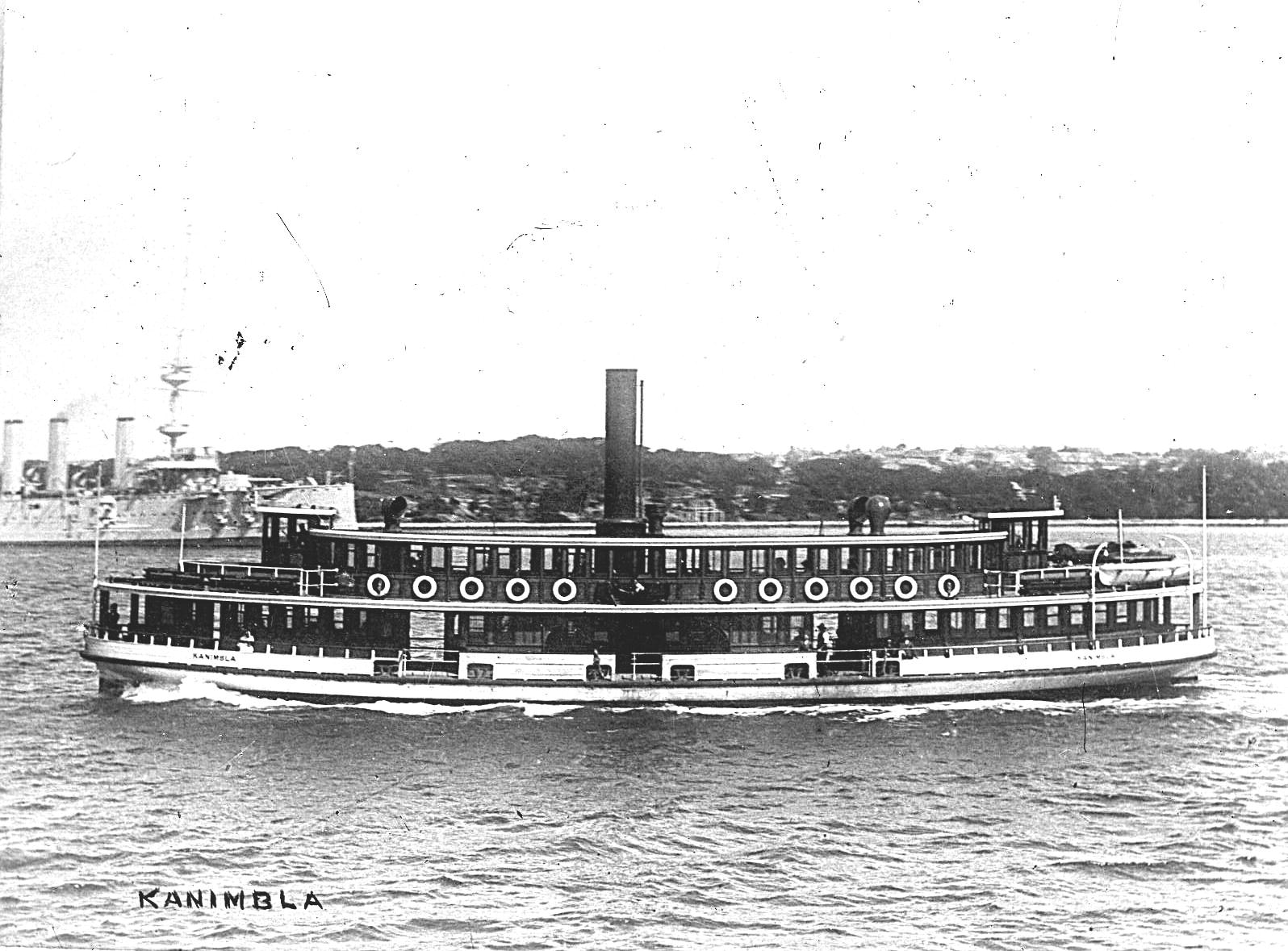
Kanimbla, as built and in her original livery

Kanimbla was built in 1910 by Morrison & Sinclair, of Johnsons Bay, Balmain for a cost of £12,489. Designed by Sydney Ferries Limited draftsman, T Barter, under the supervision of T Brown, she was described as an enlarged edition of the 1905 K-class ferry, Kareela.

Her machinery was designed by Sydney Ferries officers and supplied by Mort's Dock & Engineering Co. She was provided with 55 hp triple expansion steam engines of acting surface condensing type with three cranks. Her cyclinders are 12, 20 and 32 1/2 inches respectively with a stroke of 18-inch. Her two multitubular cylindrical boilers, 18 ft in length and 7 ft external diameter, were fitted with Deighton patent suspension furnaces with a working pressure of 180 lb. Electric lights were installed by Warbuton and Frankl.

The timber ferry was 156 tons, 35.4 m in length, and had a passenger capacity of 791. She could reach a speed of 11 knots.

Kosciusko, very similar in size and form to Kanimbla, was built the following year by David Drake, Balmain.

== Service history ==
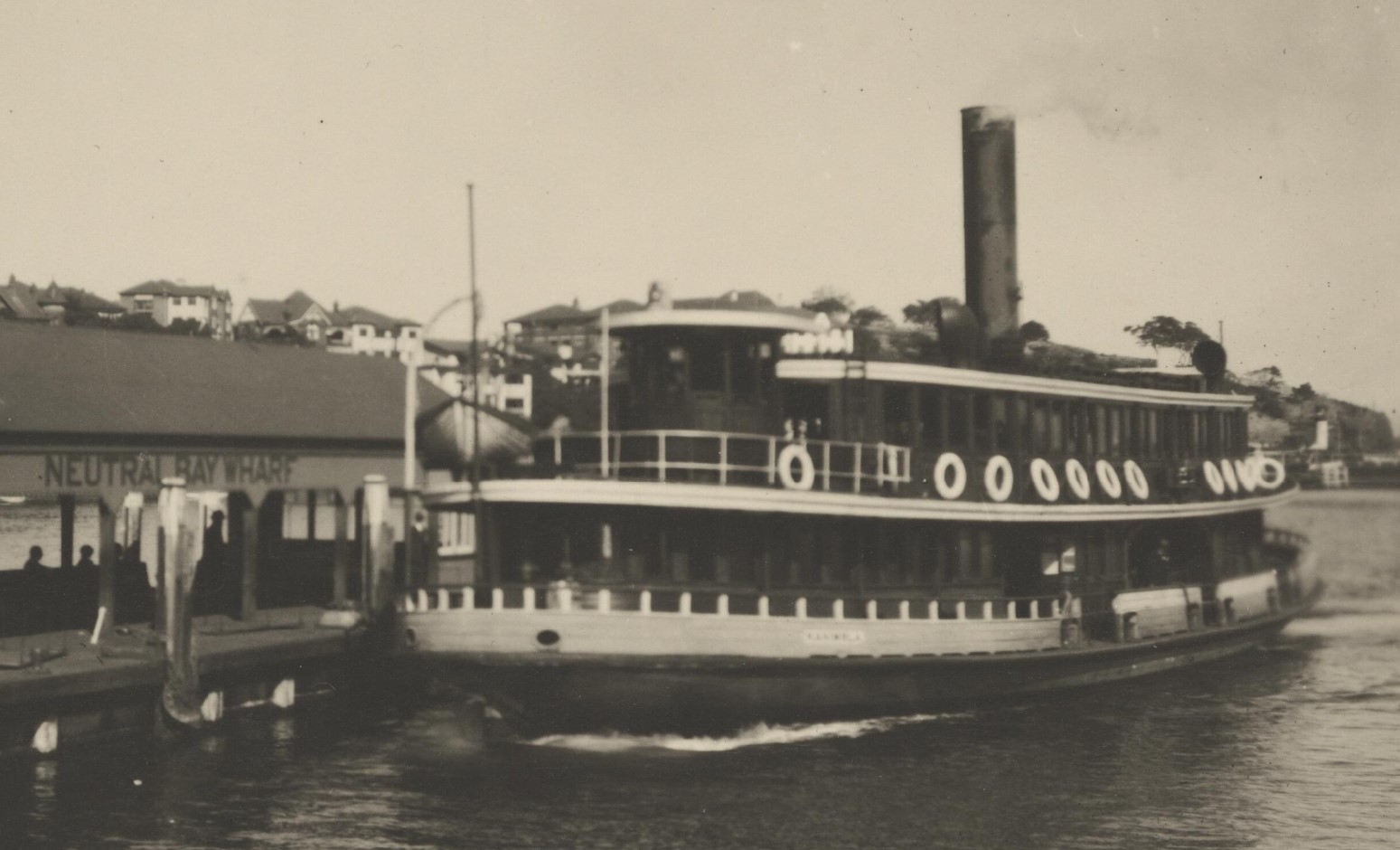
Kanimbla approaches Neutral Bay wharf, 1930

Smaller than the big Kirrule-type ferries planned for the Mosman run, and the Kulgoa and Koree on the Milsons Point route, Kanimbla was built for the narrow constrained bays of the Neutral Bay service.

Kanimbla was launched on 2 September 1909 where a crowd had gathered to watch in Johnsons Bay. A shipwright former suffered a head injury by a cable that had flown loose during the launch.

She (and Kosciusko) survived the 1932 opening of the Sydney Harbour Bridge, after which demand for ferries dropped significantly and much of the fleet was laid up.

Kanimbla gave up her original name in 1935 to a new larger Royal Australian Navy ship, HMAS Kanimbla, and became Kurra-Ba (not to be confused with the "Kurraba" a Sydney ferry laid up in 1932). Kurra-Ba was pulled out of service and laid up around 1946, and was broken up in the 1950s along with a number of other larger K-class steamers as part of a fleet rationalisation following the NSW State Government's Sydney Harbour Transport Board takeover of the struggling Sydney Ferries Limited.

Kosciusko would go onto survive the 1950s state government rationalisation of the fleet and was converted to diesel in 1959. She was sent to Hobart in 1975 to assist with cross-Derwent travel following the collapse of the Tasman Bridge. She was then used as a floating restaurant in Hobart but was burnt out during renovations in 1982.

== Incidents ==
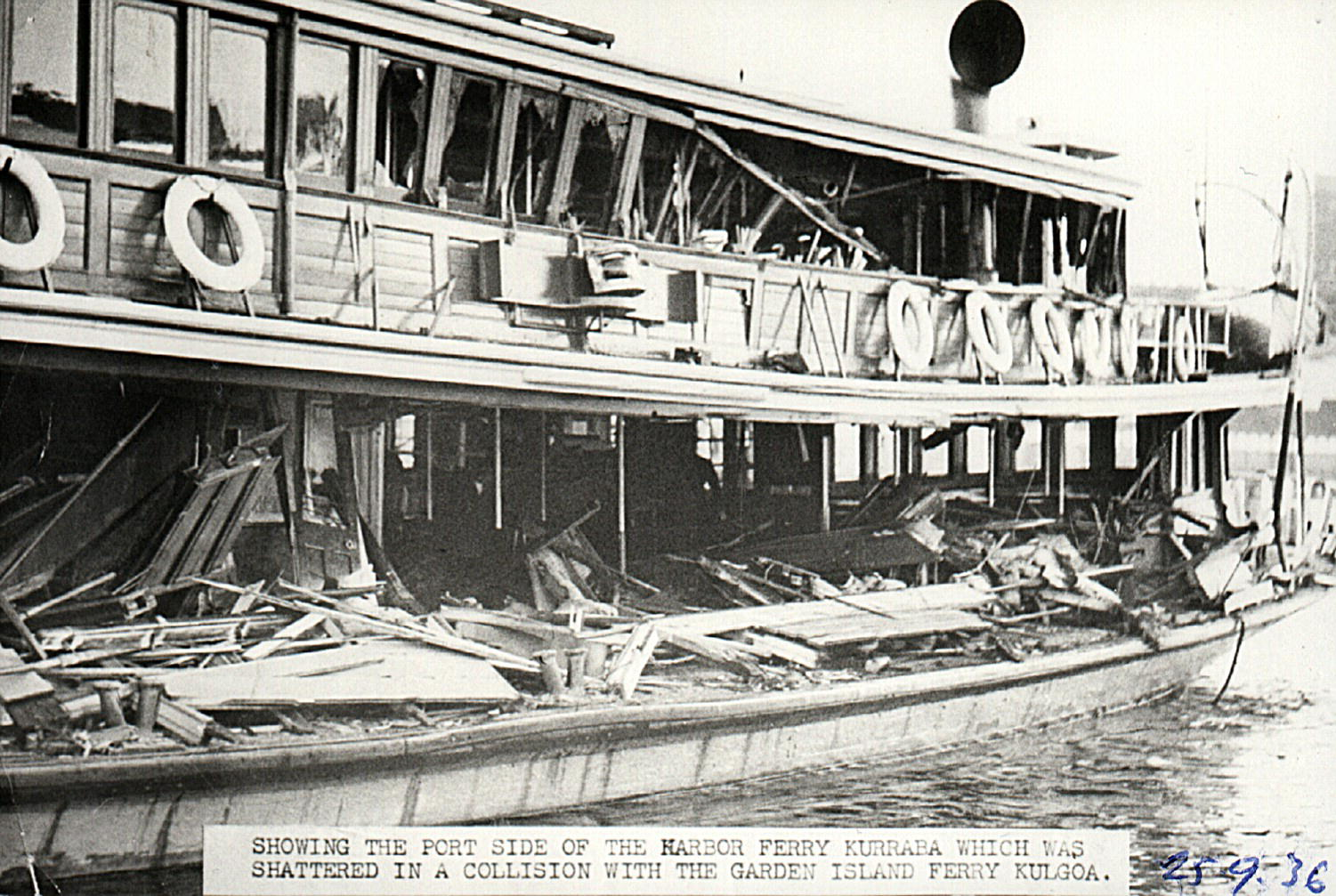
Kurra-Ba after collision with Kulgoa, 1936

- 11 August 1926 – With 230 passengers, Kanimbla collided with the Manly ferry, Binngarra near Kirribilli Point. The steel Binngarra was not significantly damaged, however, she cut deep into the timber Kanimbla which was rushed to Kirribilli to prevent her sinking. The Marine Court enquiry into the collision found the master of Kanimbla to be at fault.
- 15 June 1927 - Arguably Kanimbla's most serious incident was her collision with Manly ferry Balgowlah at Circular Quay. She was leaving Circular Quay with 100 passengers on a trip Neutral Bay when she collided head-on with Balgowlah which was heading into the Quay. The significantly larger steel-hulled Balgowlah had minor damage, whereas timber Kanimbla had her upper and lower superstructure smashed, and her port bow almost torn off with the Balgowlah penetrating the side of the smaller ferry by six feet and into the passenger cabins. Six passengers were injured and treated at Sydney Hospital. Kanimbla was settling at the bow, and she was rushed to Milsons Point where she was beached. Her passengers were transferred to the ferry Kookooburra.
- 23 September 1936 – Kurra-ba collided with ferry Kulgoa causing significant damage to her superstructure. One injured passenger was taken to hospital.

== See also ==
- List of Sydney Harbour ferries
- Timeline of Sydney Harbour ferries
- Sydney K-class ferries
