= Kulgoa =

Ferry on Sydney Harbour

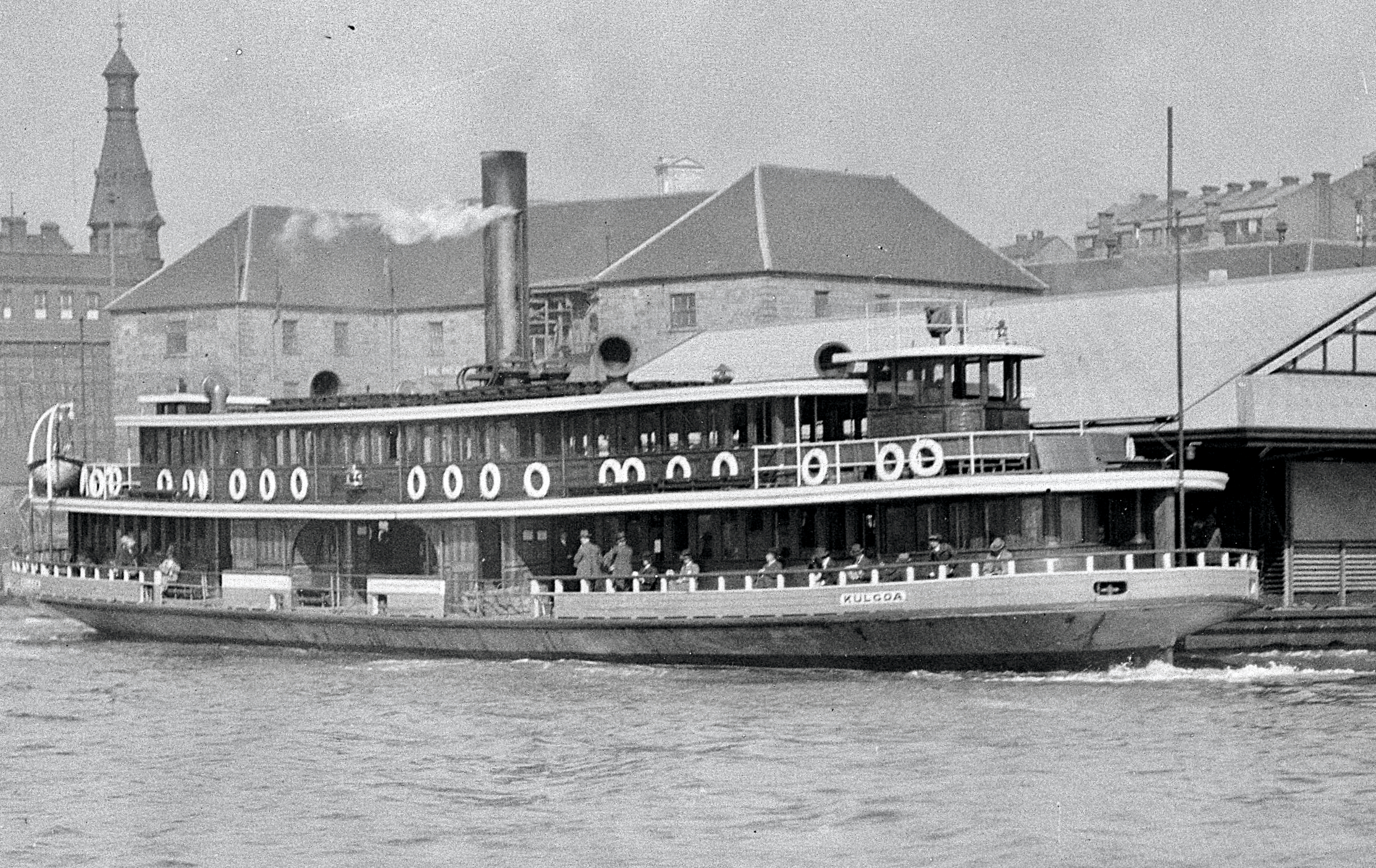
- Kulgoa in Sydney Cove, 1924

History
- Name: Kulgoa
- Namesake: Australian Indigenous word for 'returning'
- Operator: Sydney Ferries Limited
- Builder: W M Ford Jnr, North Sydney
- Launched: 1904
- In service: 1905
- Out of service: 1952
- Fate: Sold for breaking up, 1952

General characteristics
- Tonnage: 338 tons
- Length: 42.7 m
- Beam: 9.6 m
- Installed power: 60 hp triple expansion steam
- Propulsion: double-ended screw
- Speed: 12 knots
- Capacity: 1,255

Kulgoa was a "K-class" ferry on Sydney Harbour. Launched in 1905, the timber-hulled steamer was built for Sydney Ferries Limited during the boom in cross-harbour ferry travel prior to the 1932 opening of the Sydney Harbour Bridge. Kulgoa was Sydney's largest ever wooden ferry. She was a typical early example of the "K-class"; a group of double-deck, double-ended, steam-powered screw ferries. Kulgoa was one of the first Sydney ferries built with the sides of her promenade (upper) deck enclosed, although the ends near the wheelhouses remained open.

She was built for the short but busy cross-harbour route between Circular Quay and Milsons Point. Kulgoa survived the 1932 opening of the Sydney Harbour Bridge (17 other Sydney Ferries Limited vessels were sold at the time). She was sold for breaking up in 1952 as part of the fleet rationalisation following the NSW State Government takeover of Sydney Ferries in 1952.

Kulgoa followed Sydney Ferries Limited's then emerging tradition of naming their vessels after Australian Indigenous words starting with "K". "Kulgoa" is thought to be an indigenous word for 'returning'.

== Background ==
Kulgoa was built for Sydney Ferries Limited during the early twentieth century boom in cross-Harbour travel prior to the 1932 opening of the Sydney Harbour Bridge. Kulgoa was an earlier vessel of a broader type of timber double-ended screw ferry known as the K-class. The company built 25 of these vessels between the 1890s and early 1920s to meet the booming demand. The K-class were all propelled by triple expansion steam engines and were predominantly timber-hulled (four later K-class had steel hulls).

== Design and construction ==
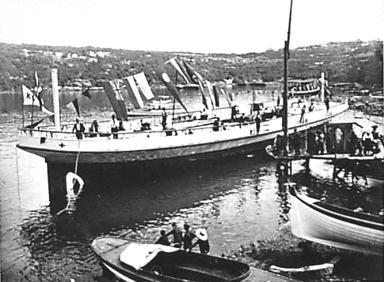
Launch day, Berrys Bay, 24 September 1904

Kulgoa's design was an evolution of Sydney Ferries Limited's 1902 steamer, Koree. Kulgoa, however, while of similar length to Koree, had a significantly wider beam (31 ft vs 27 ft 6 in) giving her a higher passenger capacity (1,255 vs 1,058) and tonnage (338 vs 276 tons).

Plans for the hull were provided by Mr Scott, foreman shipwright of the North Coast SN company from a specification from Mr T Brown, works manager of Sydney Ferries Limited. The cabins and deck fittings were designed by the company's officials under the supervision of Mr T Brown. Brown also designed and provided the specification for the boilers and machinery.

Kulgoa's hull and deck fittings were built by WM Ford at Berrys Bay, North Sydney. Dorhauer and Sons were the cabin and other deck fitting sub-contractors. Kulgoa was one of the first of Sydney Ferries to have her upper decks enclosed. She was provided with four internal side companions (stairs).

The boilers and engines were supplied by Mort's Dock & Engineering Company of Balmain. The engines were triple expansion, inverted, direct acting, surface condensing type with cylinders of 13, 21, and 34 inches respectively, providing 480 indicated horsepower. Two 18 foot-long through multi-tubular cylindrical boilers were provided with internal diameters of 7 ft 2 inch with 17 lb pressure per square inch. Each boiler was fitted with Deighton's patent 7 ft long, 92-tube, suspension furnaces. Electric lighting was provided by Edge and Edge. A sentinel steering system, provided by Wildridge and Sinclair, was installed.

Typical of the K-class, the ferry had one iron bulkhead and four wooden bulkheads. The hull shape was flared out with no overhanging sponsons. For additional strength, the side sponsons were of long ironbark sections, 12-inch square in cross section with an iron band.

Kulgoa's hull was launched in Berry's Bay on 24 September 1904 in front of a crowd of approximately 1,000 people. She was christened by Essie Carter, the daughter of J Carter, the mayor of North Sydney. At the launch, the chairman of Sydney Ferries Limited noted that the company's fleet was now able to carry 15,000 people at one time, and could carry 90,000 passengers to North Sydney in an hour. In his toast to the new ferry, the mayor of North Sydney said it would be the finest of its type in the Southern Hemisphere.

== Service history ==
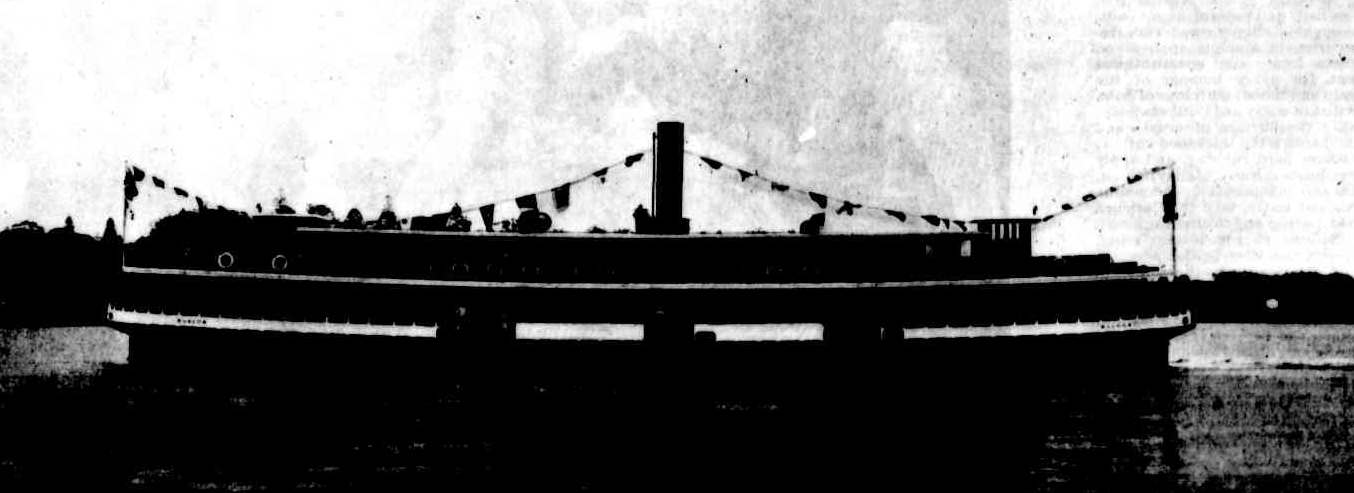
Sea trials, 13 January 1905

Kulgoa's trials were held on 13 January 1905 during which she reached a speed of 11 and 1/3 knots over the measured mile. Following the trials, she was moored at Hunters Hill for refreshments and formalities. It was noted that Kulgoa was the largest of the fleet, and that it was likely that no larger ferries would be built with Kulgoa having reached the limit. In the event, the steel Koompartoo (1922) and Kuttabul (1922) would be larger by tonnage and passenger capacity, and the timber Kuramia while slightly smaller by tonnage had a higher passenger capacity. Kulgoa remains the largest timber ferry, by tonnage, to serve on Sydney Harbour.

The largest ferry in the fleet when introduced, Kulgoa was used on the busy cross harbour routes to Milsons Point that was also served by, amongst other smaller craft, the three next largest ferries in the fleet, Kurraba (1899), Kirribilli (1900) and Koree (1902). During the 1913 ferry strike, Kulgoa was run as a free-ship (using non-unionised labour). Kulgoa was frequently used as a spectator vessels for the sailing races. At one point, likely the early 1920s, she was provided with extended controls on one wheelhouse (a flying bridge) to allow her master to see over the crowds. She remained predominantly on the Circular Quay to Milsons Point run until that service's cancellation following the 1932 opening of the Sydney Harbour Bridge.

Following the opening of the Bridge, Sydney Ferries Limited patronage fell from a 1927 peak of 47 million annually to 15 million in 1933. The Milsons Point service, which crossed the harbour at the location of the new bridge, was quickly redundant. 17 vessels from the fleet were retired from service, including K-class ferries of similar age Koree, Kummulla, Kurraba and Kirribilli. Kulgoa, however, remained in service. With the Milsons Point and Lavender Bay routes discontinued following the bridge opening, the large Kulgoa was used on the Mosman run.

Kulgoa was the first Sydney ferry to transport troops when in 1914 she carried troops of the Australian Naval and Military Expeditionary Force to the German New Guinea-bound HMAS Berrima. In World War II, she carried men to the converted troops ships Queens Mary and Elizabeth that were moored in Athol Bight.

The 1930s Great Depression and World War 2 had kept Sydney Ferries Limited annual passenger numbers around 15 million, but increased private motor vehicle usage following the war saw numbers drop to 9 million. The privately owned assets and operations of the company were taken over by the NSW State Government in 1951 and a fleet rationalisation program was implemented. Many of the now redundant large steamers were laid up. Kulgoa, the oldest and largest, was sold for breaking up in 1952. Kirrule, Kiandra and Kirawa were also laid up in 1952/53. Kareela and Kubu lasted through to 1959.

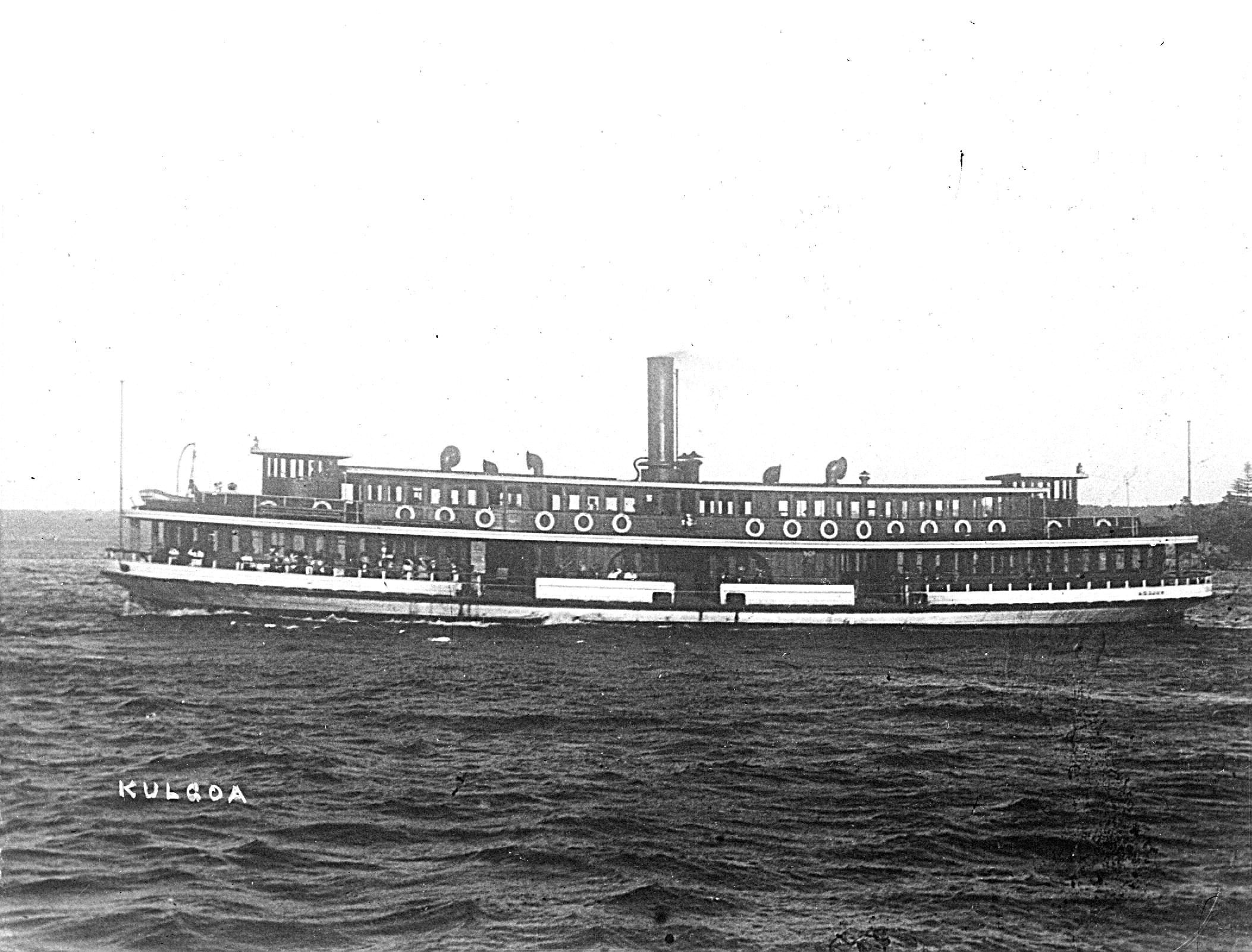
Kulgoa as built in her original livery, circa 1910

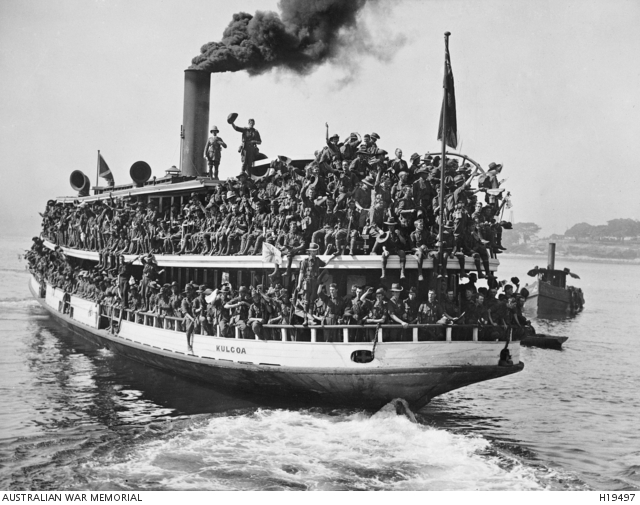
Leaving Fort Macquarie for Cockatoo Island with troops of the 1st Battalion AN&MEF, 1914

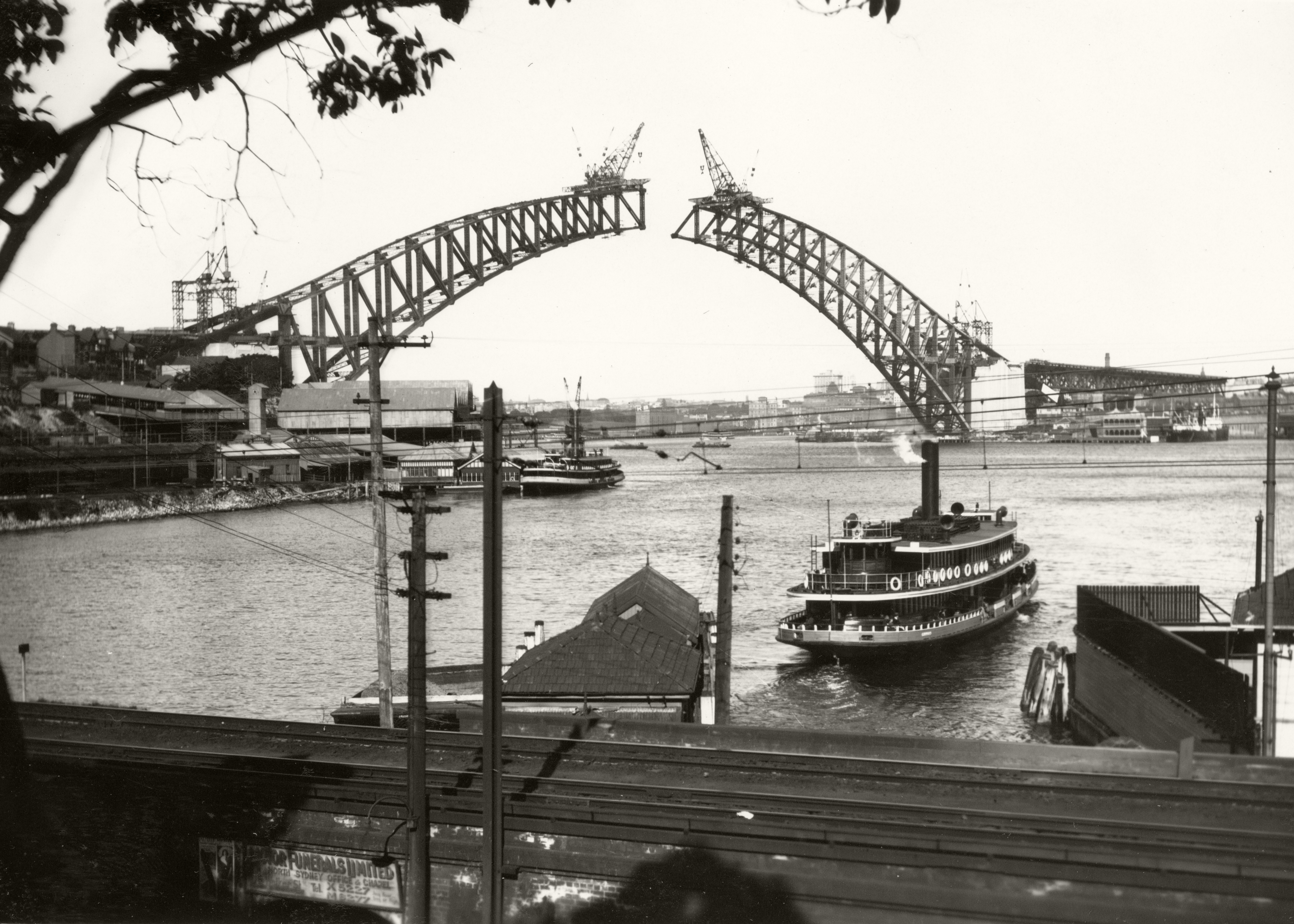
At Lavender Bay wharf, with Sydney Harbour Bridge construction in background, 1930

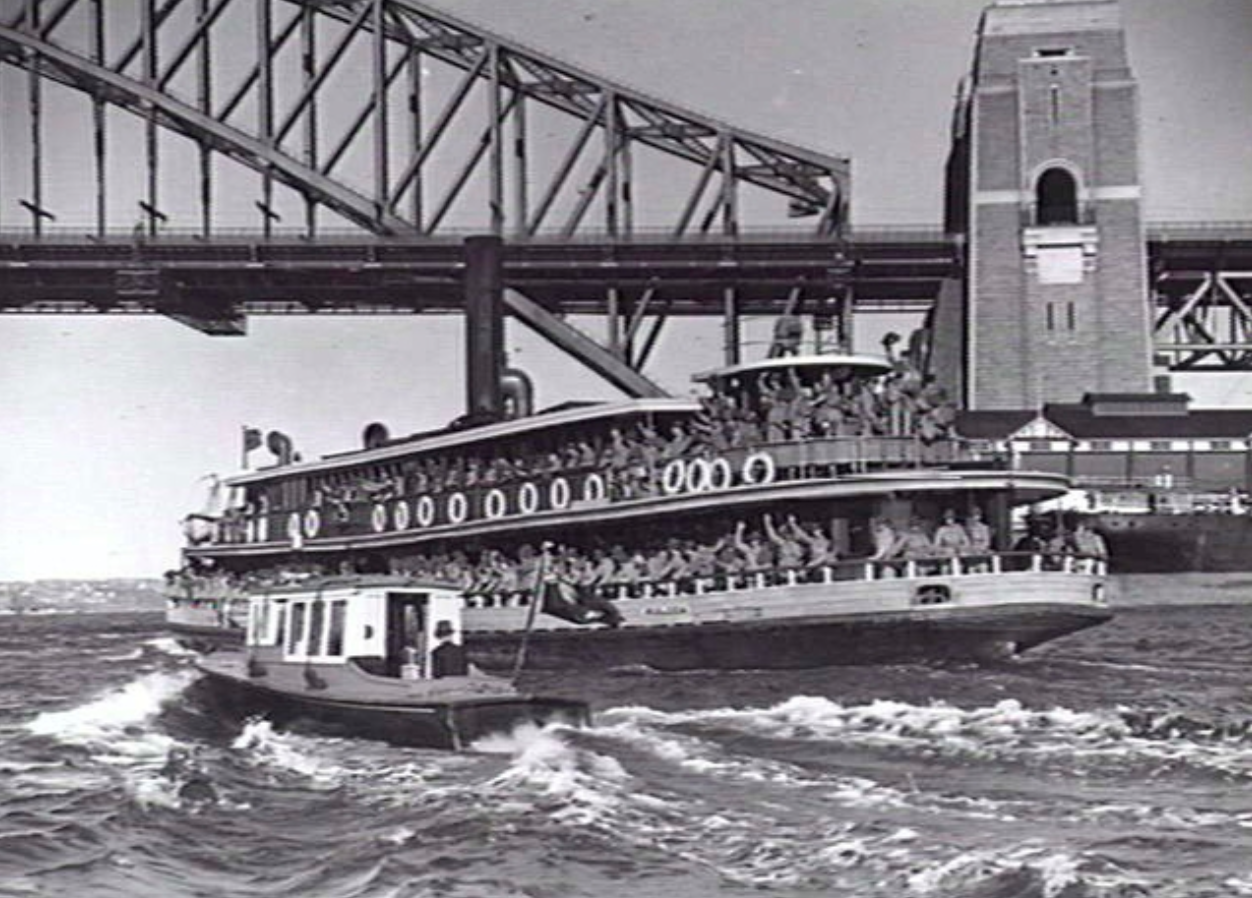
Ferrying troops to Malaya-bound troop ship, 1941

== Incidents ==
- 19 August 1909 – Kulgoa and Kaikai, the two largest inner harbour ferries at the time, collided in Sydney Cove on a foggy morning. The full Kaikai rode higher than the almost empty Kulgoa, ripping out the bulwarks of the latter. No injuries were reported.
- 21 December 1911 – The hat of John Francis Kelly, a passenger on Kulgoa, was blown off on a run between Circular Quay and Milsons Point. It was picked up by a considerate older gentleman. Such was Kelly's gratitude, he swore. He was charged for the offensive language and fined £5 in lieu of 1 months imprisonment.
- 24 February 1911 – An elderly man attempted suicide by jumping off Kulgoa. He was rescued by crew member who dived in after him.
- 25 October 1911 – Kulgoa was the first vessel on the scene after a severe collision between ferry Kaikai and the Howard Smith Company collier, Derwent. Kaikai suffered significant damage and was disabled. Her passengers were disembarked to Kulgoa.
- 11 September 1912 – Kulgoa collided with the collier Derwent.
- 6 December 1916 – A forty-two year old male passenger fell overboard and died from severe back injuries from the ferry's propeller.
- 22 January 1921 – Kulgoa collided with the launch Betty, off Fort Macquarie. Two passengers on Betty jumped overboard but were rescued.
- 24 January 1921 – On a trip from Milsons Point to Circular Quay, Kulgoa collided with the tug Stormcock. Kulgoa had about 10 feet of her bulwarks smashed, while the stern of Stormcock was damaged. There were no injuries.
- 10 June 1921 – On a foggy morning, Kulgoa collided with Kosciusko. Both ferries were on their way to Circular Quay, with Kulgoa in-bound from Milsons Point, and Kosciusko from Neutral Bay. Kosciusko had part of bulwarks and men's smoking cabin smashed, whereas damage to Kulgoa was limited to the davit crane and locking gear of the rudder.
- 27 November 1923 – Kulgoa collided with the Neutral Bay wharf at Circular Quay damaging about 10 feet of bulwarks.
- In June 1925, she collided with Kulgoa. An August 1925 Marine Court of Inquiry did not find anyone culpably negligent. The court found that the Lane Cove ferry The Lady Mary, hid the larger ferries Kuramia and Kulgoa from each other until Kulgoa was abreast of The Lady Mary until a collision between the larger two was inevitable. No injuries occurred due to the crew being able to clear passengers from the forward of Kuramia.
- In June 1925 - Kulgoa collided head on with Kuramia in Sydney Cove. An August 1925 Marine Court of Inquiry did not find anyone culpably negligent. The court found that the Lane Cove ferry The Lady Mary, hid the larger ferries Kuramia and Kulgoa from each other until Kulgoa was abreast of The Lady Mary until a collision between the larger two was inevitable. No injuries occurred due to the crew being able to clear passengers from the forward of Kuramia. While no injuries were reported, both vessels suffered significant damage to their bows, with Kuramia's smoking cabin also smashed in.
- 13 August 1930 – Kulgoa collided with Kaikai then a moment later with Kirrule off Milsons Point. No-one was injured, but about 10 metres of bulwark was stripped off Kulgoa.
- 24 September 1936 – Kulgoa, en route from Circular Quay, collided in Sydney Cove with Kurra-Ba which was returning to Circular Quay from Neutral Bay and Kirribilli. One passenger on Kulgoa was injured and both boats suffered significant damage and were taken out of service for repair.
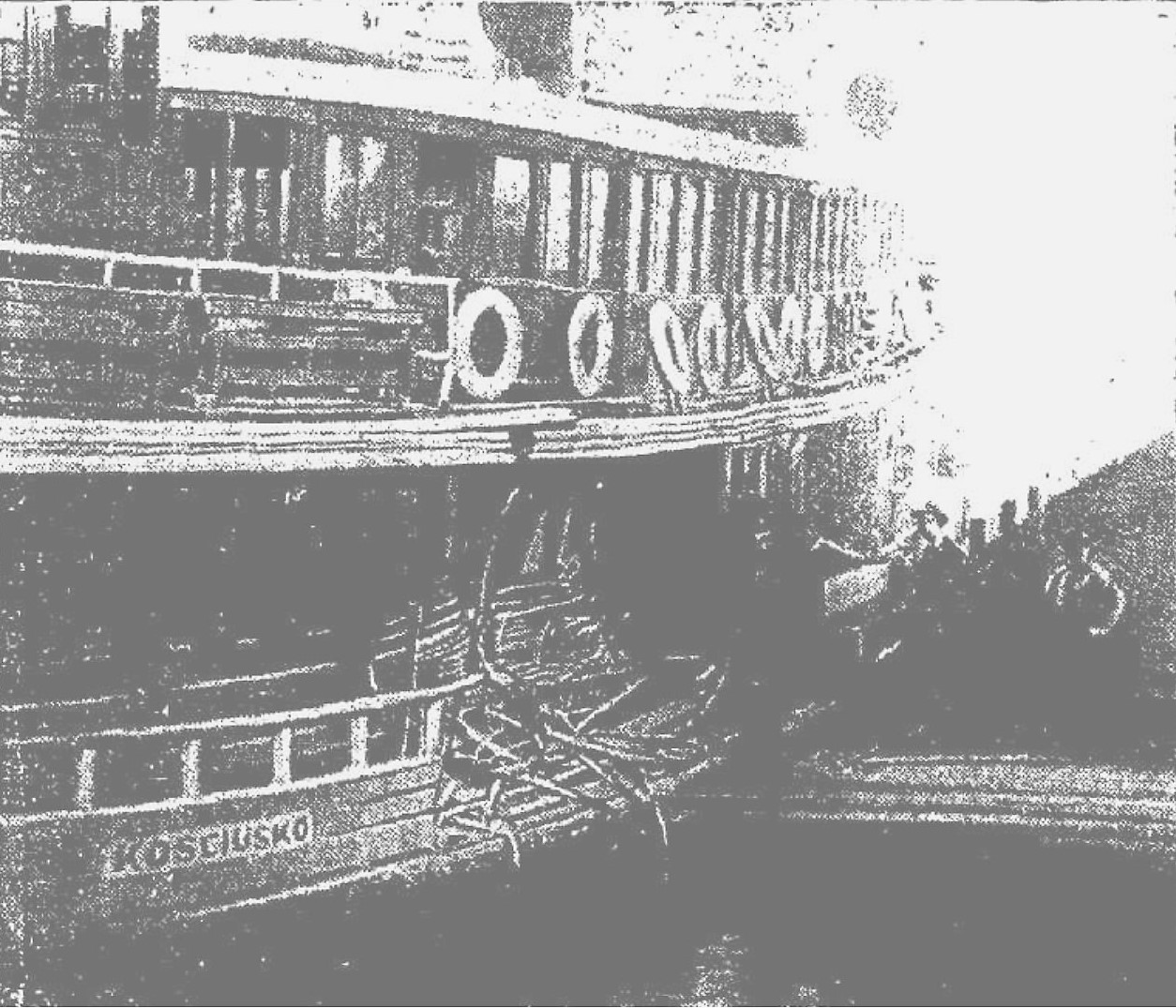
K-class ferry, Kosciusko, after collision with Kulgoa, 10 June 1921

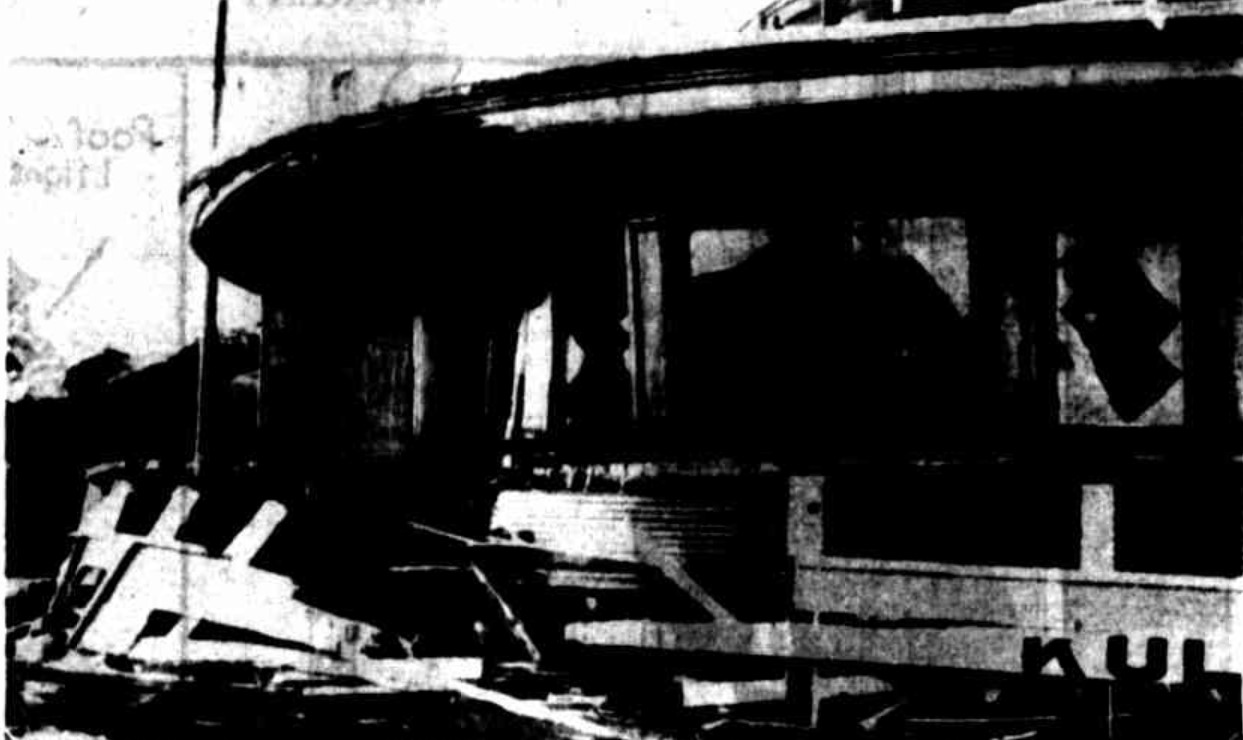
Kulgoa after collision with Kurra-Ba, 1936

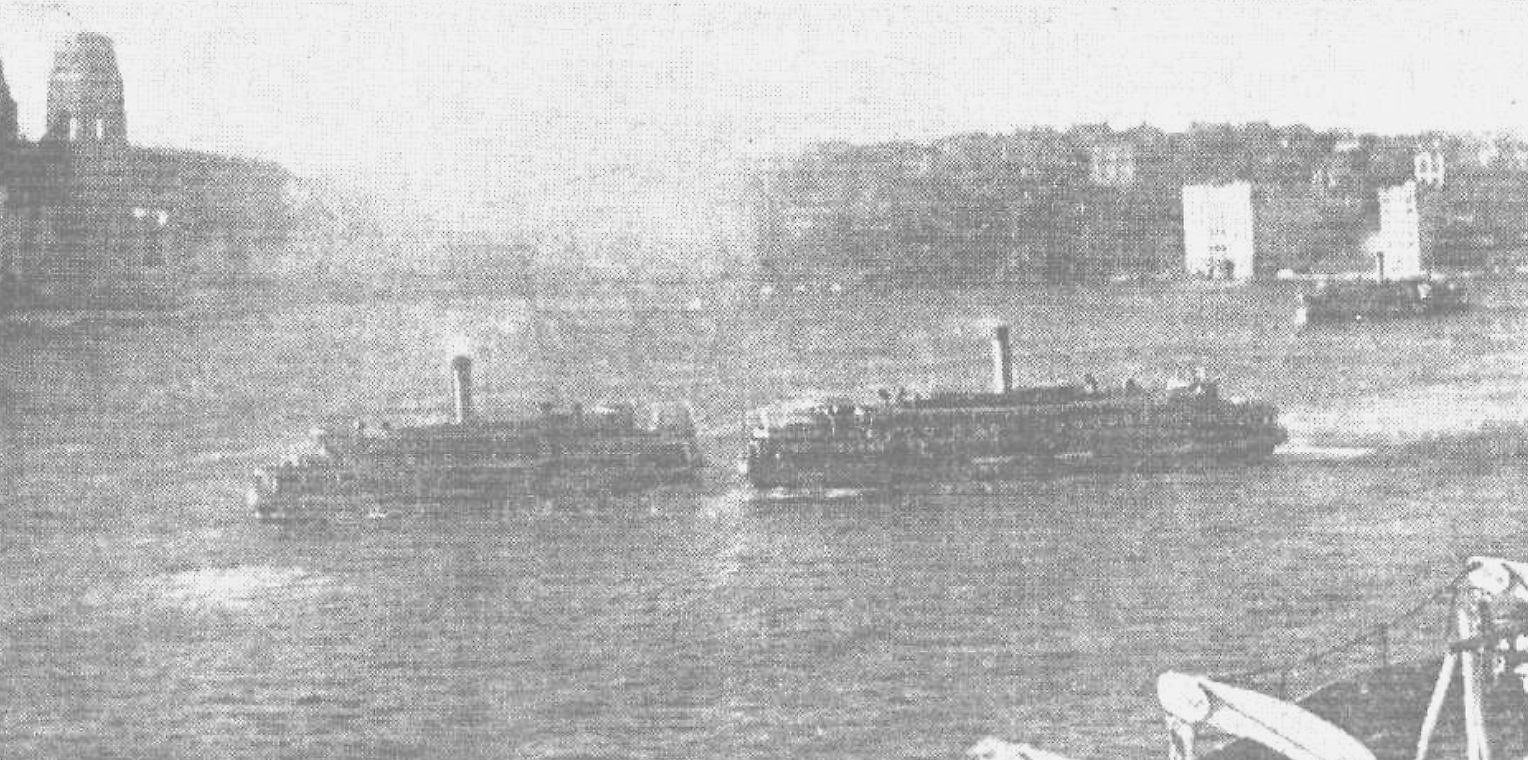
Kurra-Ba (left) and Kulgoa (right) immediately after their 1936 collision

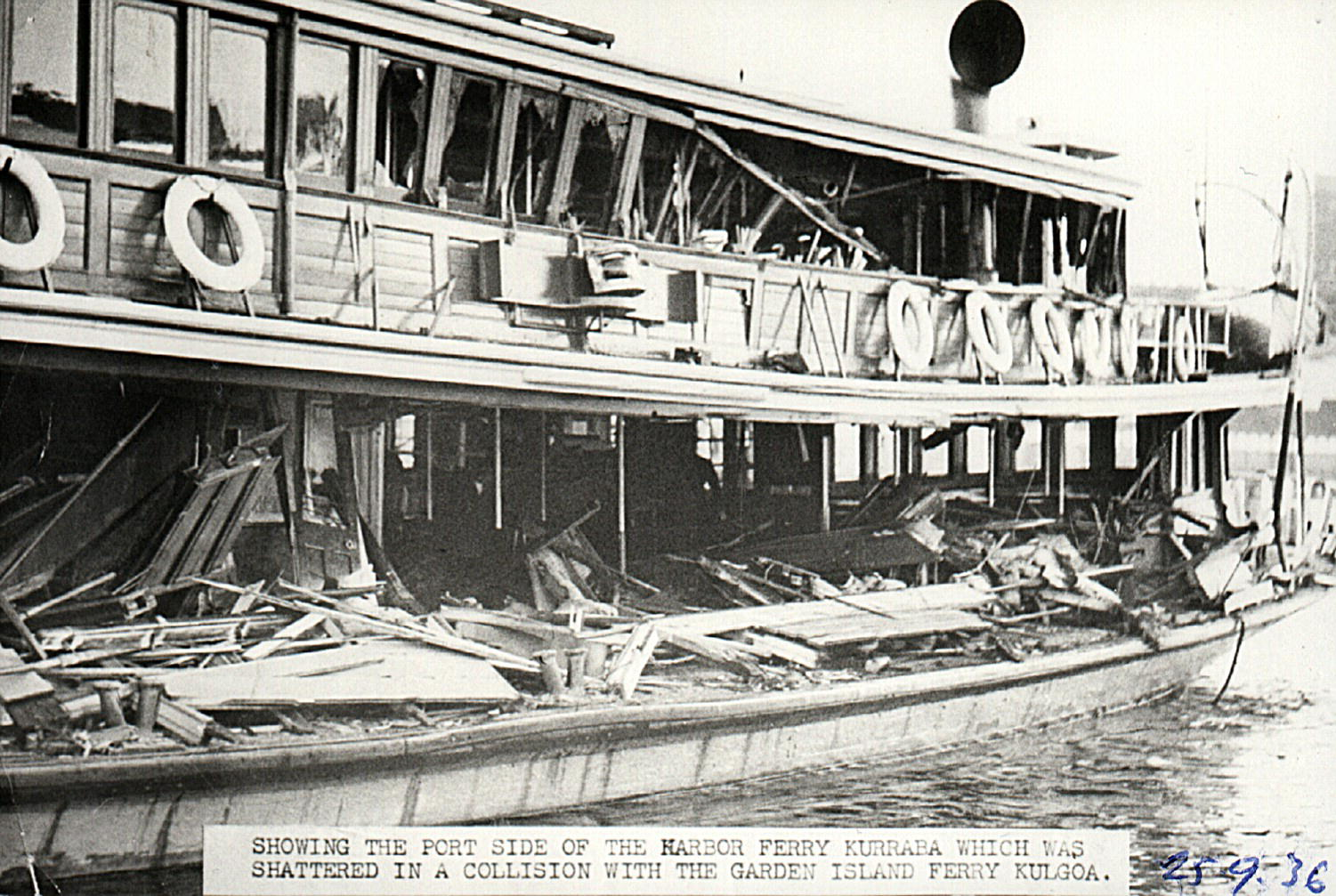
Damage to Kurra-Ba after her 1936 collision with Kulgoa

== See also ==
- List of Sydney Harbour ferries
- Timeline of Sydney Harbour ferries
- Sydney K-class ferries
