= Kookooburra =

Sydney Harbour ferry

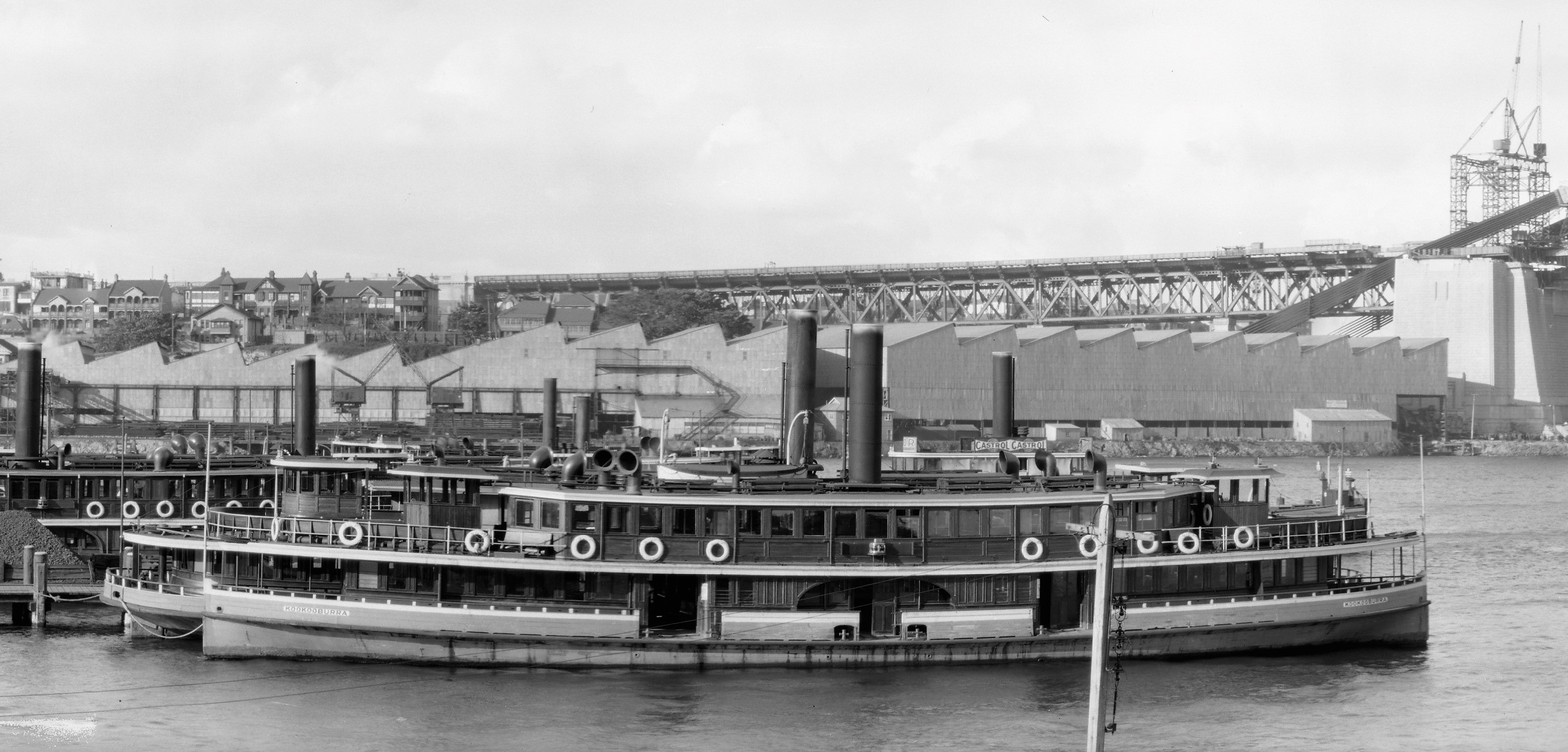
- Kookooburra at McMahon's Point

History
- Name: Kookooburra
- Operator: Sydney Ferries Limited
- Builder: Morrison & Sinclair, Balmain
- Cost: £12,894
- Launched: 6 December 1906
- In service: 1907
- Out of service: 1947, sold to Newcastle
- Fate: Broken up 1959

General characteristics
- Tonnage: 180
- Length: 42.7 m
- Beam: 7.7 m
- Speed: 12 knots
- Capacity: 794

Kookooburra was a "K-class" ferry on Sydney Harbour. Commissioned in 1907, the timber-hulled steamer was built for Sydney Ferries Limited during the boom in cross-harbour ferry travel prior to the opening of the Sydney Harbour Bridge. She was retired from Sydney Harbour service in 1947 after which she was sent to Newcastle. She is thought to have been broken up in 1959.

Kookooburra was Sydney Ferries' first attempt to design and build a ferry suitable for the Parramatta River run which the company took over in 1901.

Kookooburra followed the Sydney Ferries convention of naming their vessels after Australian Aboriginal words starting with "K".

== Background ==
Kookooburra was built for Sydney Ferries Limited during the early twentieth century boom in cross-Harbour travel prior to the 1932 opening of the Sydney Harbour Bridge. At the time, the company ran one of the largest ferry fleets in the world. The ferry was part of broader type of around 20 double-ended timber screw ferries - the Sydney K-class ferries - that the company commissioned between the 1890s and early 1920s to meet the booming demand.

Kookooburra followed Sydney Ferries Limited's convention of naming their vessels after Australian Aboriginal words starting with "K". The name is an alternative spelling for the Australian bird, Kookaburra.

== Design and construction ==
Launched on 6 December 1906 by the daughter of David Fell, the timber-hulled Kookooburra was designed and built by Morrison and Sinclair Ltd of Balmain for £12,894.

Like all K-class ferries, she was built as a double-ended two-deck steam ferry with wheelhouses at either end of the promenade deck. The 180 ton ferry was 42.7 m in length, had a beam of 7.7 m, and a draught of 3.2 m. She could carry up to 794 passengers. Kookooburra was 8.5 m longer than the previously largest Parramatta River steamer, the single-ended Bronzewing, and she could carry 200 more passengers. She was built with four side companions connecting the main and upper decks. She was the second K-class, after the 1906 Kareela, to be built with fully enclosed, sash-windowed, upper decks. (the open upper decks of earlier K-class ferries were later enclosed).

Her 61 hp triple expansion steam engines pushed her to 12 knots. The machinery was supplied by Campbell & Calderwood of Paisley and were installed by Wildridge and Sinclair. Her cylinders were 13-inch, 21-inch, and 35-inch in diameter respectively with a stroke of 21 inches. Her boilers were supplied by Mort's Dock and Engineering. The ferry had combined hand and steam steering gear controlling balanced rudders. The hull had five bulkheads.

With limited height and draught, Kookooburra was Sydney Ferries Limited's first attempt to design a ferry specifically for the Parramatta River service, which the company acquired in 1901. Her keel, of 14 x 10 hardwood, was carried inside to lessen the draught. The short funnel was replaced with a much taller funnel like other K-class steamers relatively early in her career. The hull was built of bent double frames of spotted gum timber. Unusually for a K-class ferry, she was originally fitted with a short funnel for service along the river and its low bridges. Passengers, however, were showered with soot and awnings were placed on either end of the promenade deck. Also unusual for a K-class ferry, were her pointed stems (bow and stern) rather than rounded stems. The only other K-class ferry with both short funnel and pointed stems was the similar but smaller Kaludah (built in 1909 as Kuranda). Kaludah burnt out and sank in 1911, and is possibly the shortest-lived of all Sydney Harbour ferries.

As built, Kookooburra was finished in Sydney Ferries' livery of the time - white hull, varnished superstructure with white trim along the promenade deck and black funnel. Following the 1932 opening of the Sydney Harbour Bridge, the company introduced a new livery painting hulls and bulwarks green, superstructures predominantly yellow, and with yellow funnels topped in black.

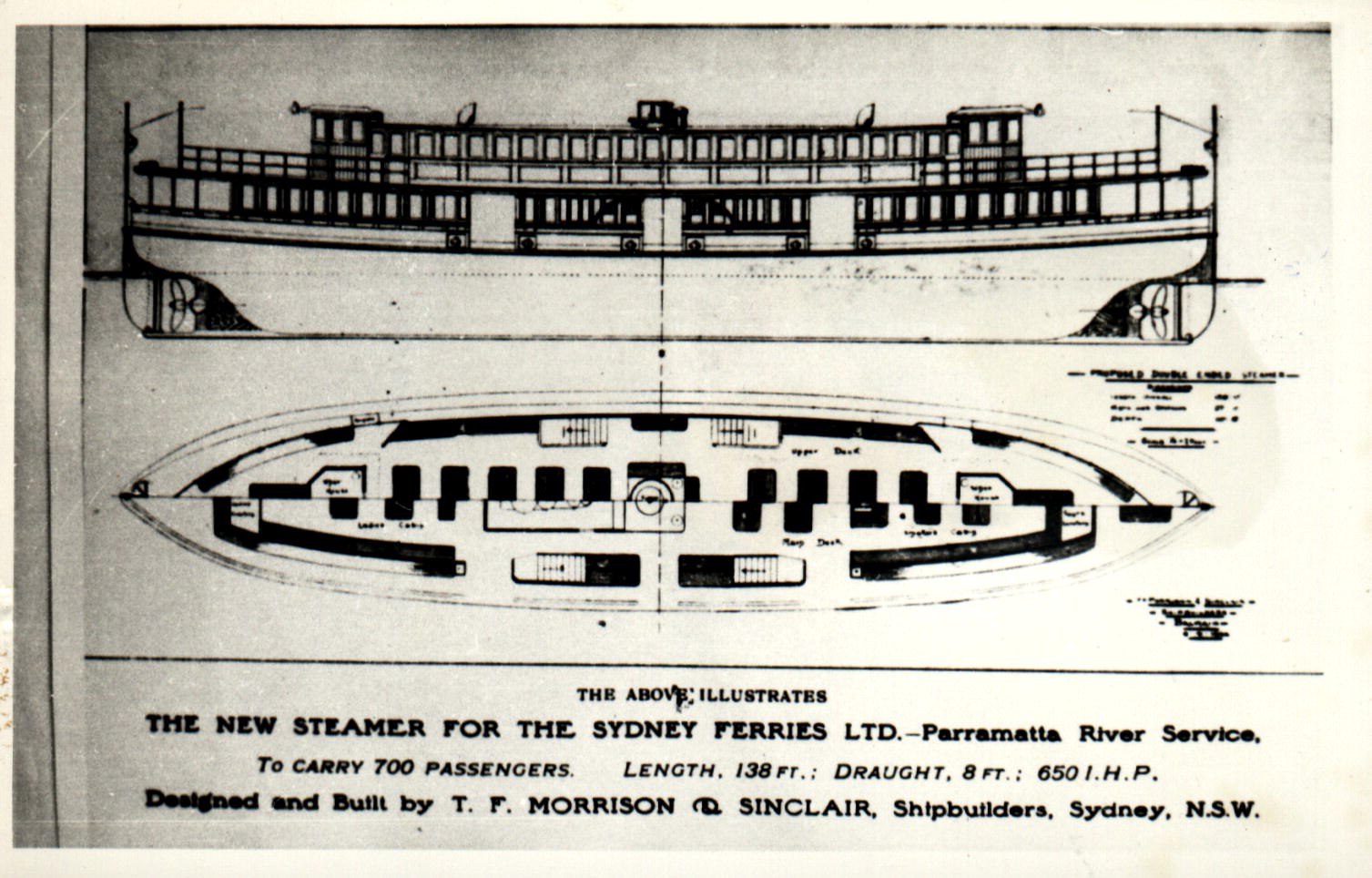
General arrangement drawings circa 1906

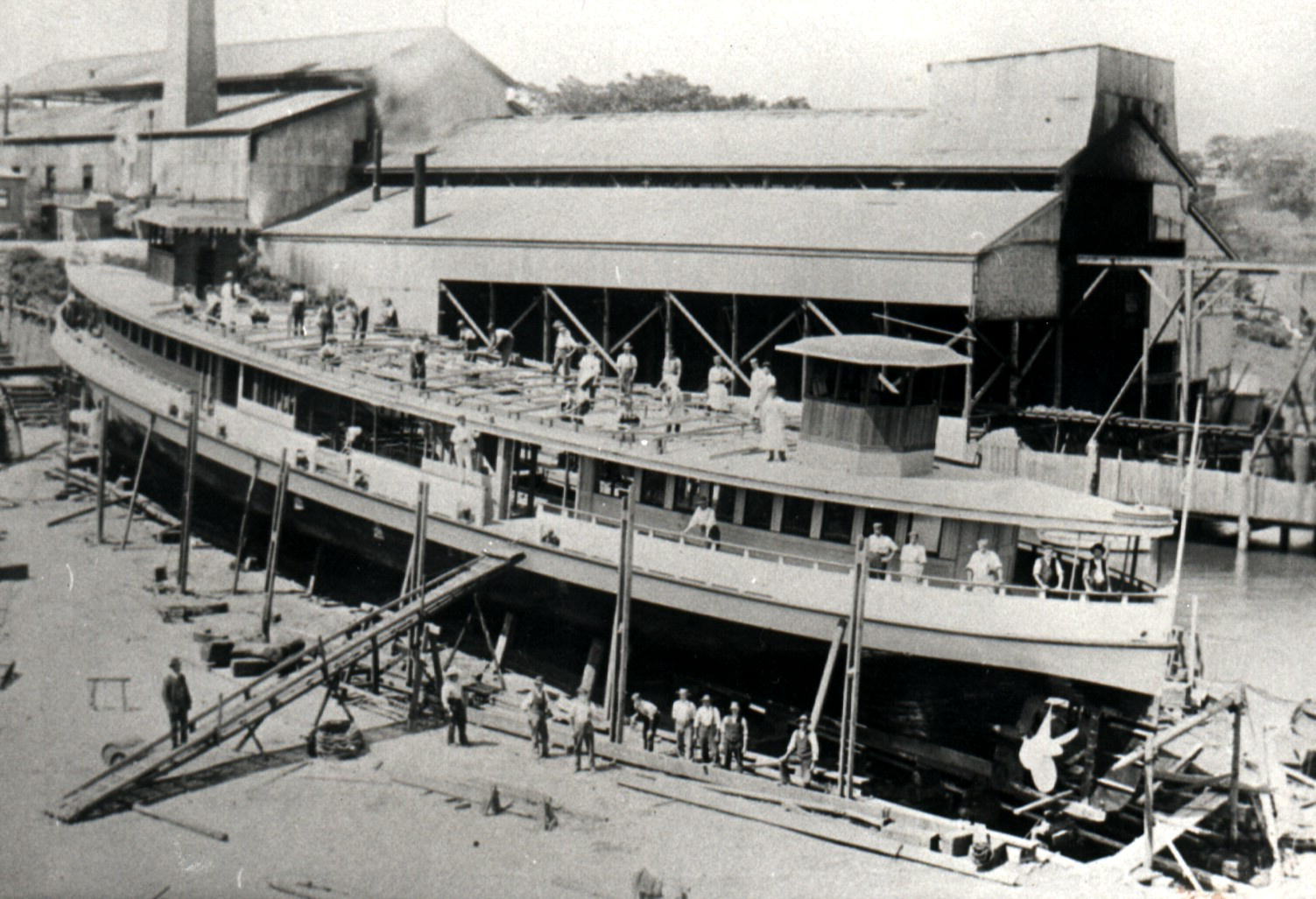
Nearing launch day, Morrison & Sinclair yard, Balmain.

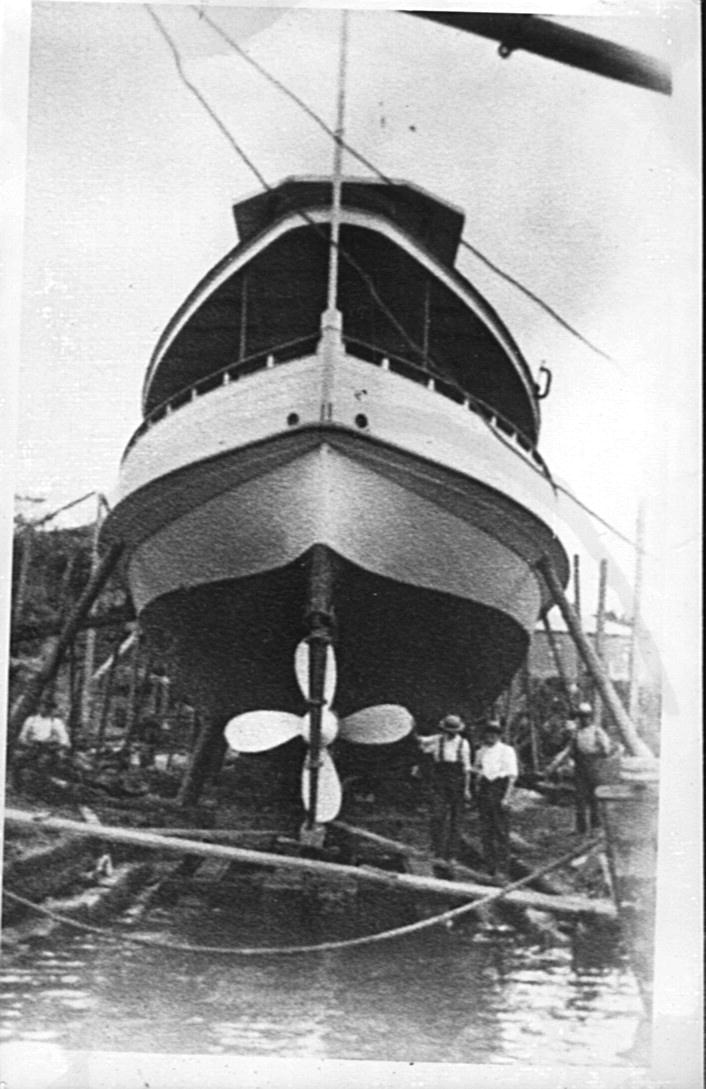
One of only two K-class ferries with pointed bows/sterns.

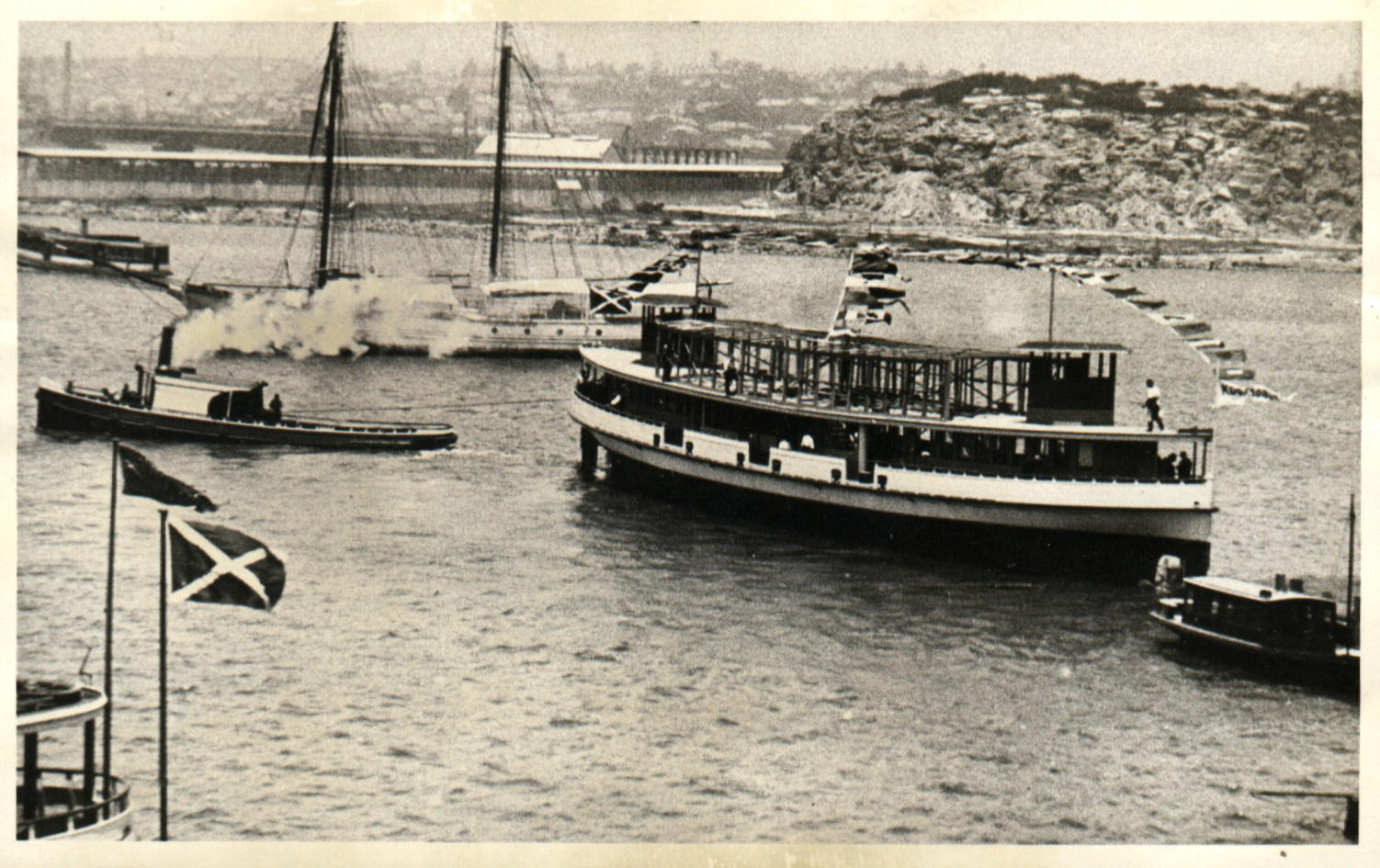
Launch day, 6 December 1906

== Service history ==
Kookooburra was designed and built to work along the Parramatta River route. In the 1910s, she ran a weekly "Round The Harbour Trips" cruise for domestic and foreign tourists. Along with Kubu and Kirrule, she operated a successful sideline in the 1920s as a harbour excursion vessel.

Kookooburra survived the 1932 opening of the Sydney Harbour Bridge, after which Sydney Ferries Limited annual patronage fell from 40 million passengers to 15 million. Eighteen boats in the fleet, however, were retired immediately or within a few years of the bridge. These included fellow timber K-class steamers, Kirribilli, Kirribilli, Kummulla, Sydney's highest capacity ferries the large steel K-class Kuttabul and Koompartoo, and the entire cross-harbour vehicular ferry fleet.

By the early 1940s, Kookooburra mainly serviced the Quarantine Station at North Head, taking people who had been medically cleared for entry to the city. In her later years, she was also used as a spare boat, most notably along Lane Cove River route where her speed was advantageous. In the late 1940s, she was sent to Walsh Island, Newcastle to carry dockyard workers. She is thought to have been was broken up in 1959.

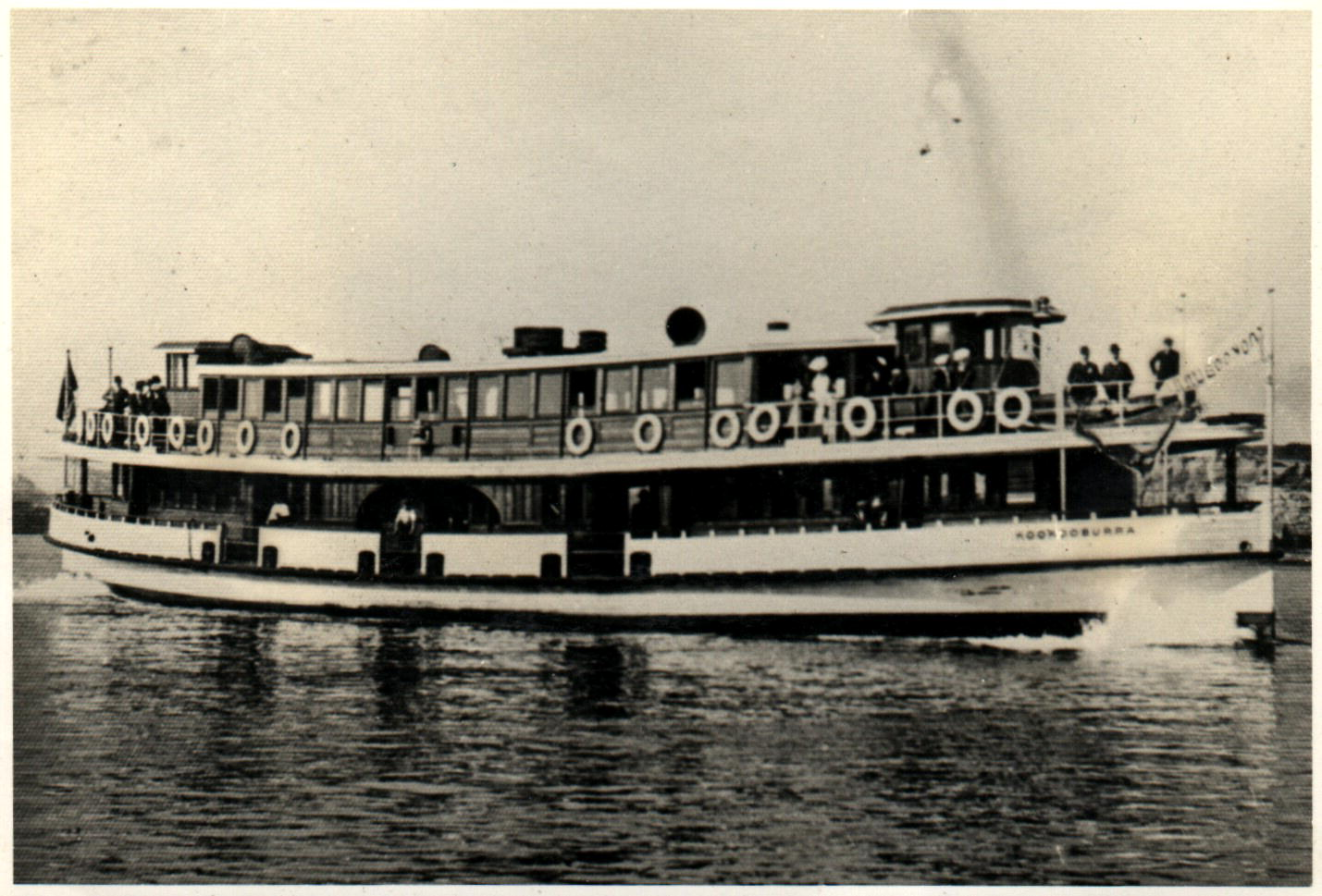
On her trials, 1907, prior to the placement of awnings.

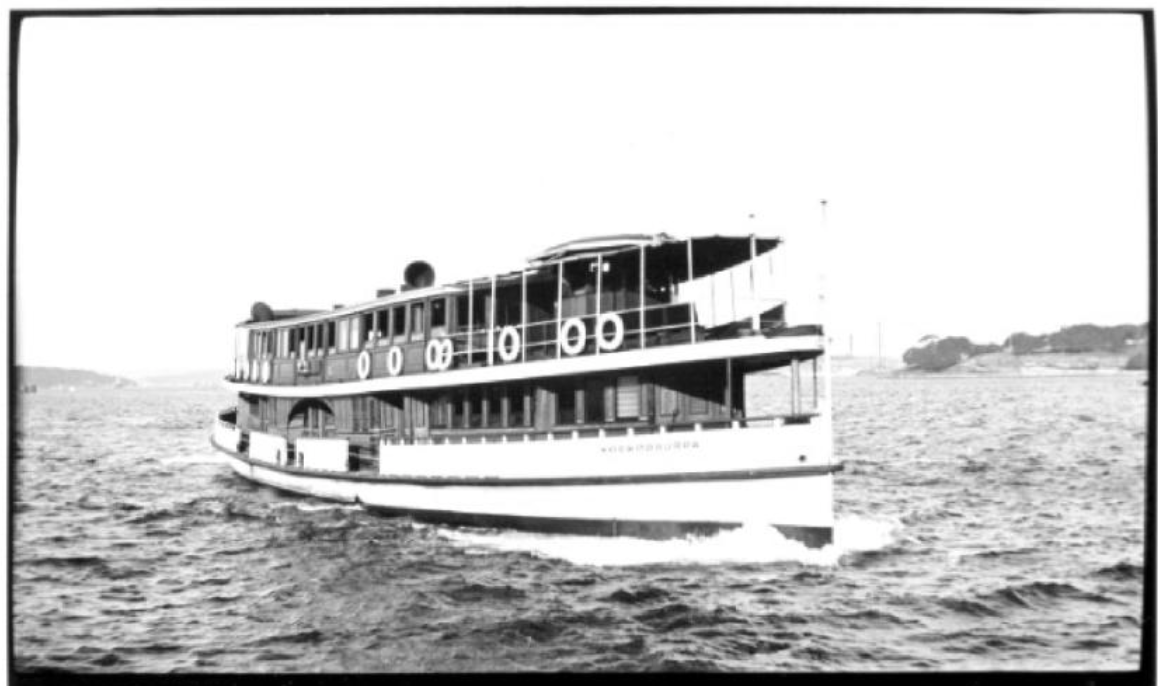
Kookooburra, early in her career with short funnel and awnings to protect passengers from soot.

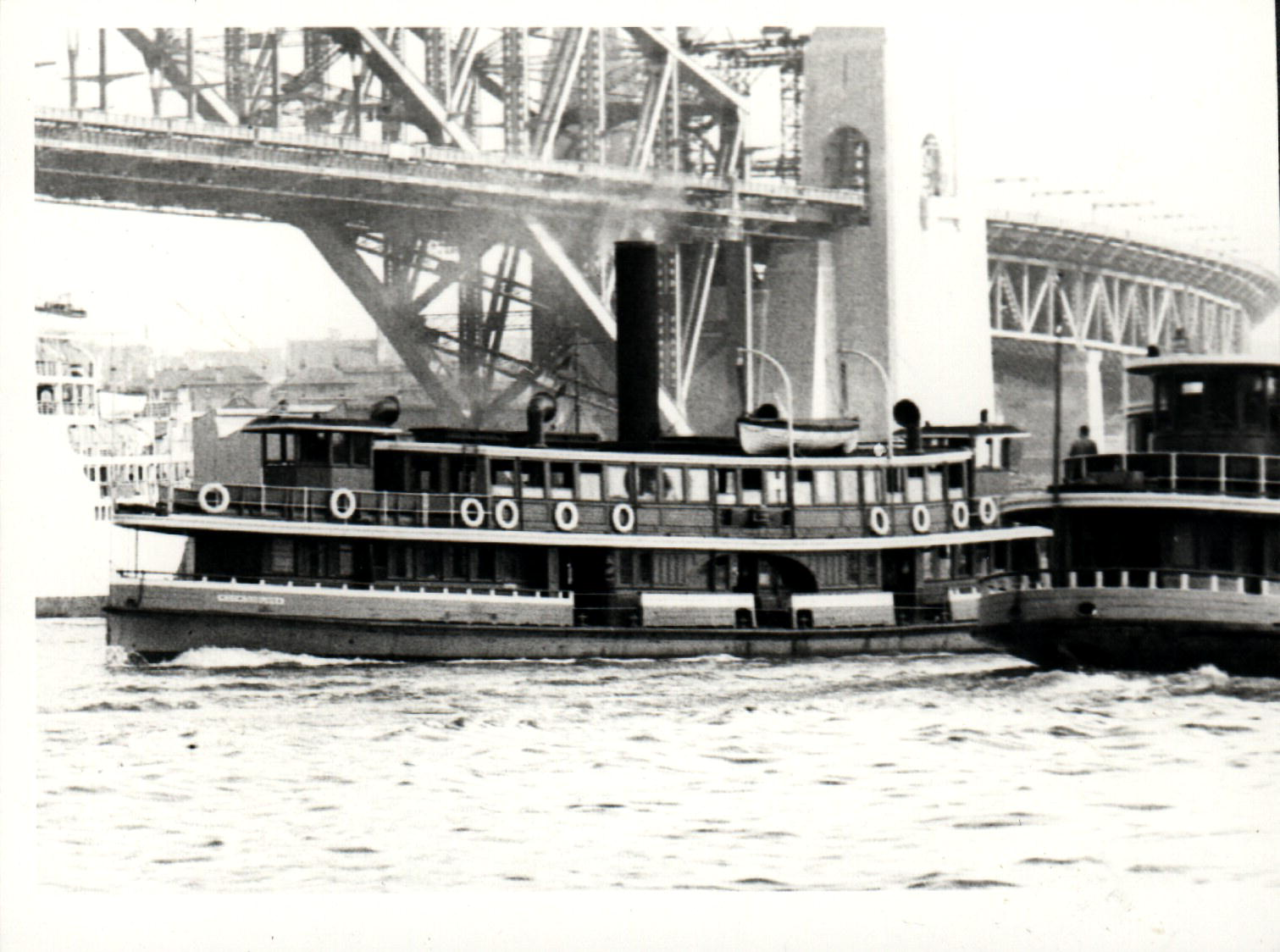
Kookooburra (centre) and another K-class ferry 4 months prior to the opening of the Sydney Harbour Bridge. Note Kookooburra's pointed stems in comparison the other K-class rounded stem.

== Incidents ==
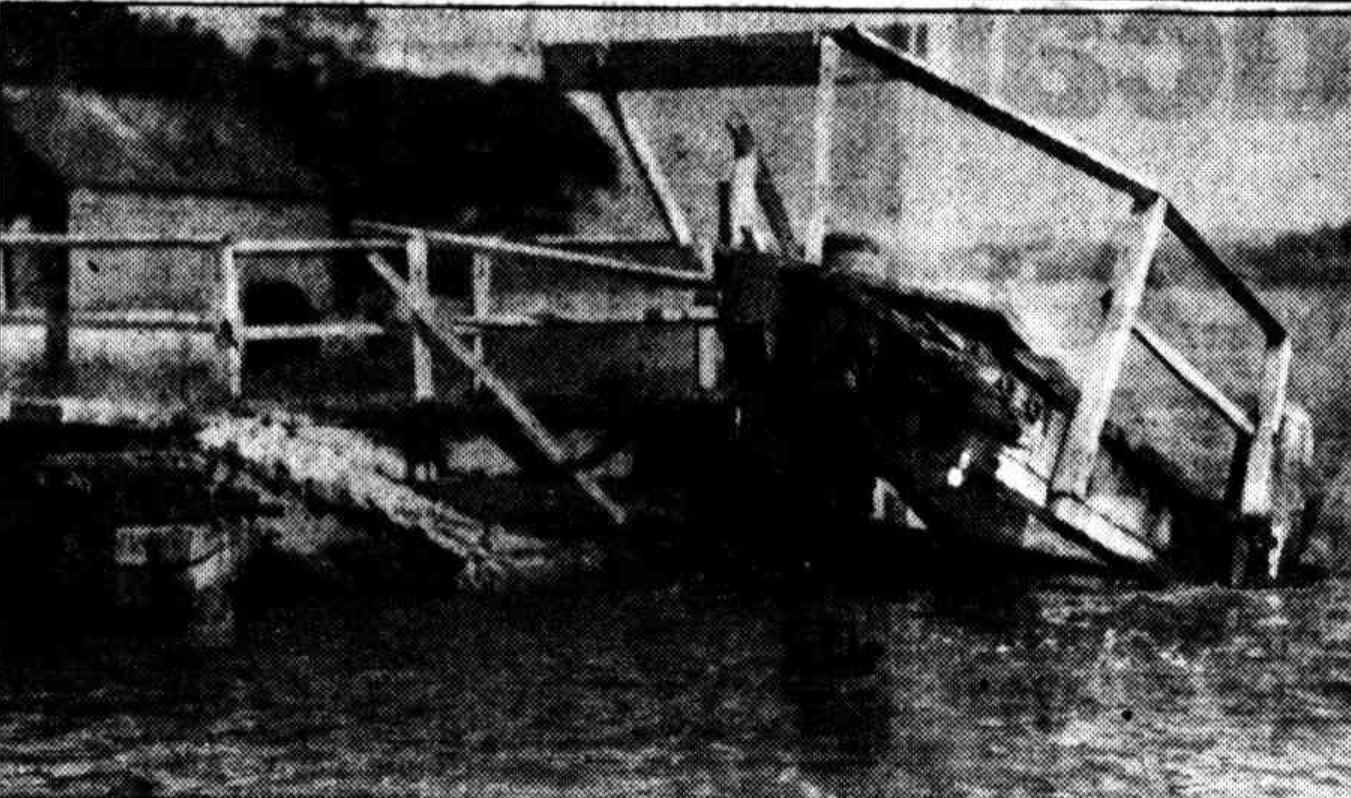
Long Nose Point ferry wharf (now Birchgrove) collapsed after being struck hard by Kookooburra, March 1942

- 26 May 1911 - A fire breaks out on Kookooburra while she is on a weekend excursion trip to Middle Harbour. The fire starts around 3:30 pm on her return part way between the Bluff and Green Point. Her 200 passengers are partially evacuated to the tug, Kate, the nearby ferry Kailoa and smaller craft. The fire is brought under control by the crew and passengers. Damage is not extensive and confined to planking over the boiler. Kookooburra was able to return to Circular Quay under her own steam escorted by ferry Kangaroo.
- 31 December 1911 - Returning to Circular Quay from a New Year's Eve trip to Balmoral Beach, a brawl breaks out on the Kookooburra involving about 20 young men "misconducting themselves". The brawl and accompanying indecent language occurs in front of a lot of women and children. William Booth, 20, was later convicted on charges of drunkenness and using indecent language. He was fined 10 shillings, or 7 days gaol, for the former, and £5, or two months gaol, for the latter.
- 5 May 1927 - A hundred passengers are transferred to Kookooburra after ferry Kanimbla collides with Manly ferry, Balgowlah, almost sinking Kanimbla.
- 31 July 1929 - Kookooburra collided with the Newcastle and Hunter River Company's steamer, Gwydir near Blues Point. Kookooburra was returning to Circular Quay, and Gwydir had entered the harbour from Newcastle. The ferry's bow was damaged as was the belting on the port and starboard sides, but there were no injuries.
- 28 June 1930 - Passengers were transferred from Kiandra to Kookooburra after the former loses steering control through rudder and limps from Bennelong Point to near Milsons Point and back to Circular Quay.
- 3 March 1942 - Kookooburra hits Long Nose Point Wharf (today's Birchgrove Wharf). The jetty collapses but there are no injuries.
- 29 March 1943 - Kookooburra collides with Lady Scott, both with full peak hour loads, off Kirribilli during thick morning fog. 20 feet of Kookooburra's sponson is torn off. She then bumps into a cutter in the fog as she backs away from Lady Scott but neither boat is seriously damaged in the second collision.

== See also ==
- List of Sydney Harbour ferries
- Timeline of Sydney Harbour ferries
- Sydney K-class ferries
