= Kareela (ferry) =

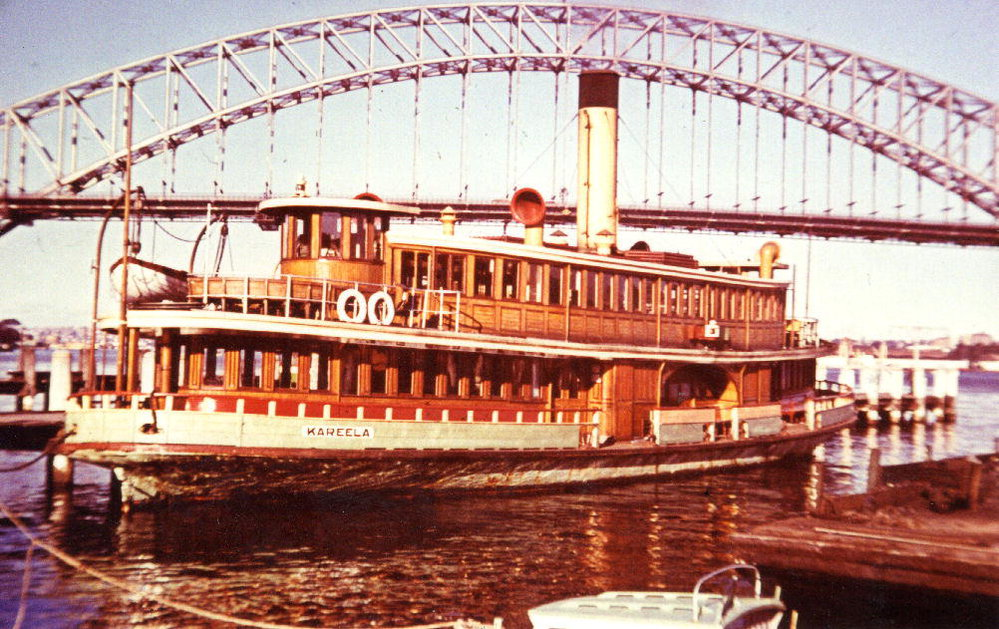
- Kareela at Sydney Ferries Limited base, McMahons Point 1950s

History
- Name: Kareela
- Operator: Sydney Ferries Limited; Sydney Harbour Transport Board
- Builder: Morrison & Sinclair Ltd
- Launched: 1905
- Out of service: 1959
- Fate: Broken up

General characteristics
- Tonnage: 186 tons
- Length: 34.4 m
- Speed: 10 knots
- Capacity: 784 passengers approx.

Kareela was a "K-class" ferry on Sydney Harbour. Launched in 1905, the double-ended timber-hulled steamer was built for Sydney Ferries Limited in response to the early twentieth century boom in cross-harbour ferry travel prior to the opening of the Sydney Harbour Bridge. She was the first of Sydney Ferries Limited's boats to have a fully enclosed upper deck.

She survived the 1932 opening of the Sydney Harbour Bridge when many ferries were removed from service, and also the early 1950s rationalisation of the fleet following its takeover by the Government of New South Wales. Nicknamed "The Box", she had a relatively incident free career apart from a collision with a wharf that killed three of her passengers. She was sold in 1959 and broken up.

"Kareela" is thought to be an Australian Aboriginal word meaning "south wind".

== Background ==
Kareela was built for Sydney Ferries Limited during the early twentieth century boom in cross-Harbour travel prior to the 1932 opening of the Sydney Harbour Bridge. At the time, the company ran one of the largest ferry fleets in the world. A population boom in the suburbs of Neutral Bay, Cremorne, and Mosman saw them served by an increasing number of ferries. The ferry was part of a broader type of around 20 double-ended timber screw ferries, the Sydney K-class ferries, that the company commissioned between the 1890s and early 1920s to meet the booming demand.

Kareela followed the Sydney Ferries Limited tradition of naming their vessels after Australian Aboriginal words starting with "K". "Kareela" is thought to mean "south wind".

== Design and construction ==
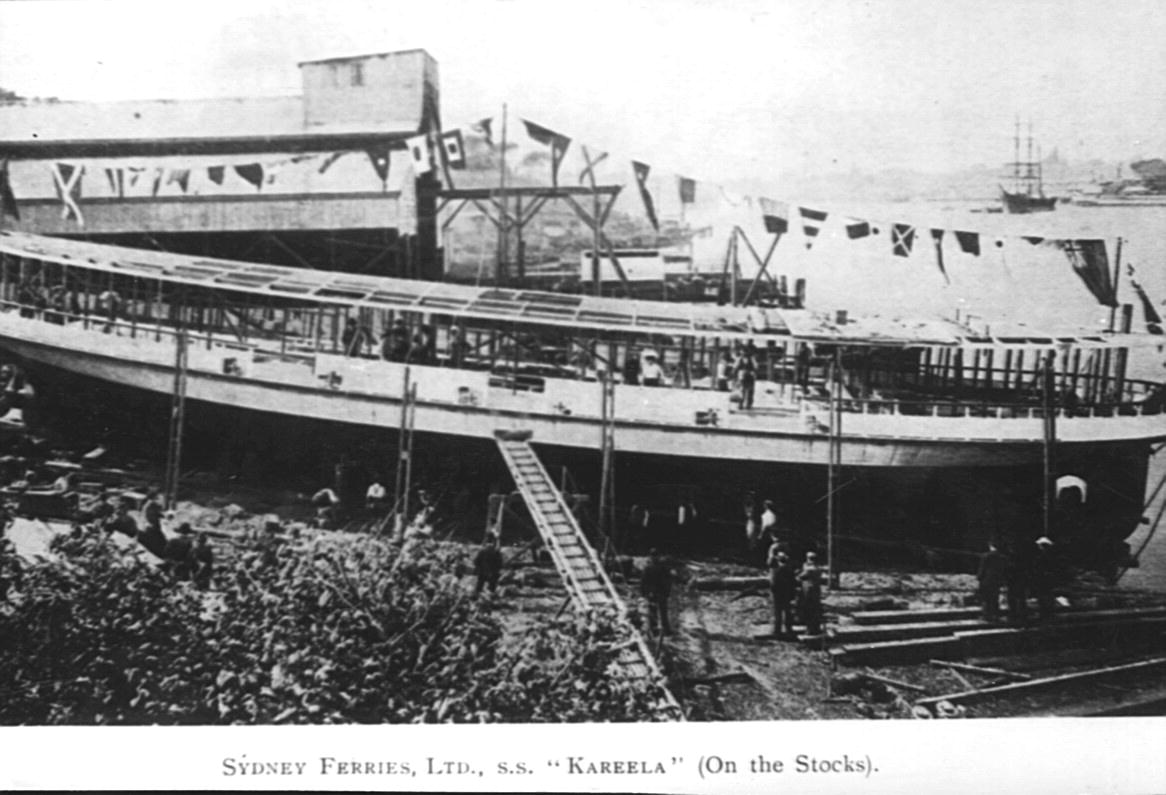
Kareela on stocks at builders, likely on her launch day, 1905

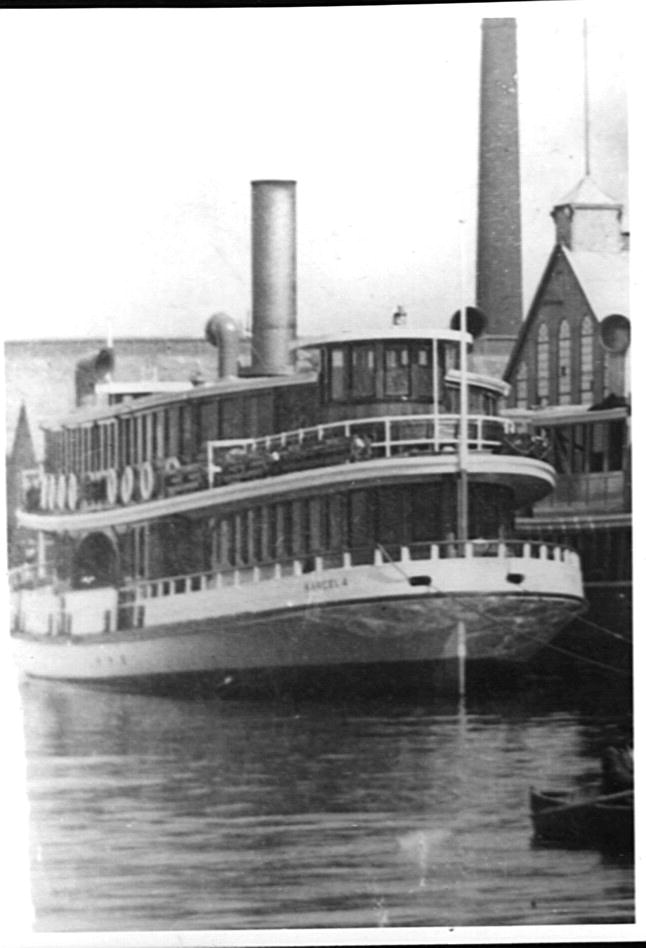
Being fitted out at Morrison Sinclair, 1905

Built in 1905, Kareela's hull, cabins and deck fittings were by Morrison & Sinclair Ltd, of Balmain. Her hull was flamed right out with no overhanging sponsons. The sponsons were made of 14 x 10 inch iron bark girders, and the vessel was double framed of hard wood, making it one of the harbour's strongest ferries at the time. The hull of the ferry was designed by Scolt, s foreman shipwright of the North Coast Steam Navigation Company, from a specification by T Brown, the Sydney Ferries Ltd works manager. The cabins and other deck fittings were designed by the companies' officials, under the supervision of T Brown. She had one iron bulkhead and four of wood. She was built with lodging knees around the inside of the hull and 24 hanging knees. The keel consisted of three lengths of iron bark, the longest being 50 feet. There were 20 iron stanchions in the engine and boiler rooms. Under the deck over the boilers were galvanised iron sheets to minimise fire risk.

Kareela was 186 tons, 34.4 m in length, and had a passenger capacity of 784.

She was the first ship built by Sydney Ferries Limited to have fully enclosed upper decks. The earlier K-class vessels, including Kurraba, Kirribilli, Koree and Kulgoa, had only the sides of their upper decks enclosed, leaving the ends open, with the roofs being squared off. Kareela and all subsequent K-class vessels had an upper deck structure with curving roof lines that met at the rear of the wheelhouses, thus the upper deck saloon was fully enclosed. Kareela had four companionways, two on each side, leading to the upper deck.

Her boiler's 40 hp triple expansion steam engine was supplied by Chapman & Co Ltd and pushed her to a speed of 10 knots. The compound surface condensing engines had cylinders 14 inches x 27 inches in diameter, with a stroke of 18 inches. The electrics, including 83 16-cp incandescent light fittings, were provided by Scott, Henderson and Co. Her two steering wheels were made from teak taken from the former HMS Nelson.

== Service history ==
Kareela was launched on 31 May 1905. Among those present were Mr Russell (chairman of directors), W G Todd (secretary Sydney Ferries, Limited), and Mr Sinclair (of Morrison and Sinclair). The vessel was christened by Miss Enid Russell (thought to be the chairman's daughter), who broke a bottle of champagne on the propeller of the vessel. The ferry's trials were on 7 September 1905 and she entered service 4 days later initially on the Neutral Bay run. Kareela earned the nickname "The Box", which may have been due to appearing to not float any lower in the water no matter how many passengers she was carrying.

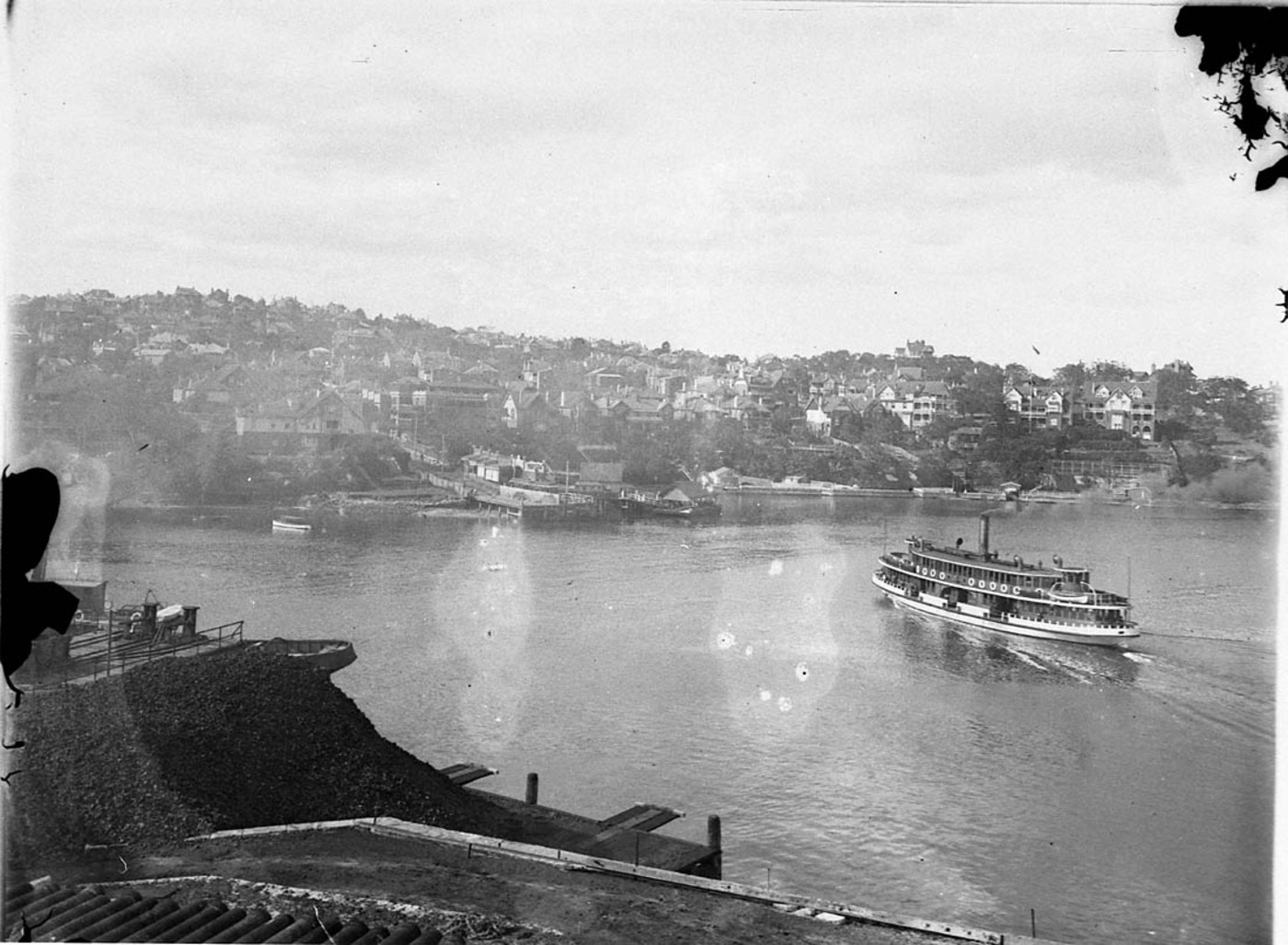
On the Neutral Bay run, likely pre-1920s, on which she was mostly used during the first part of her career.

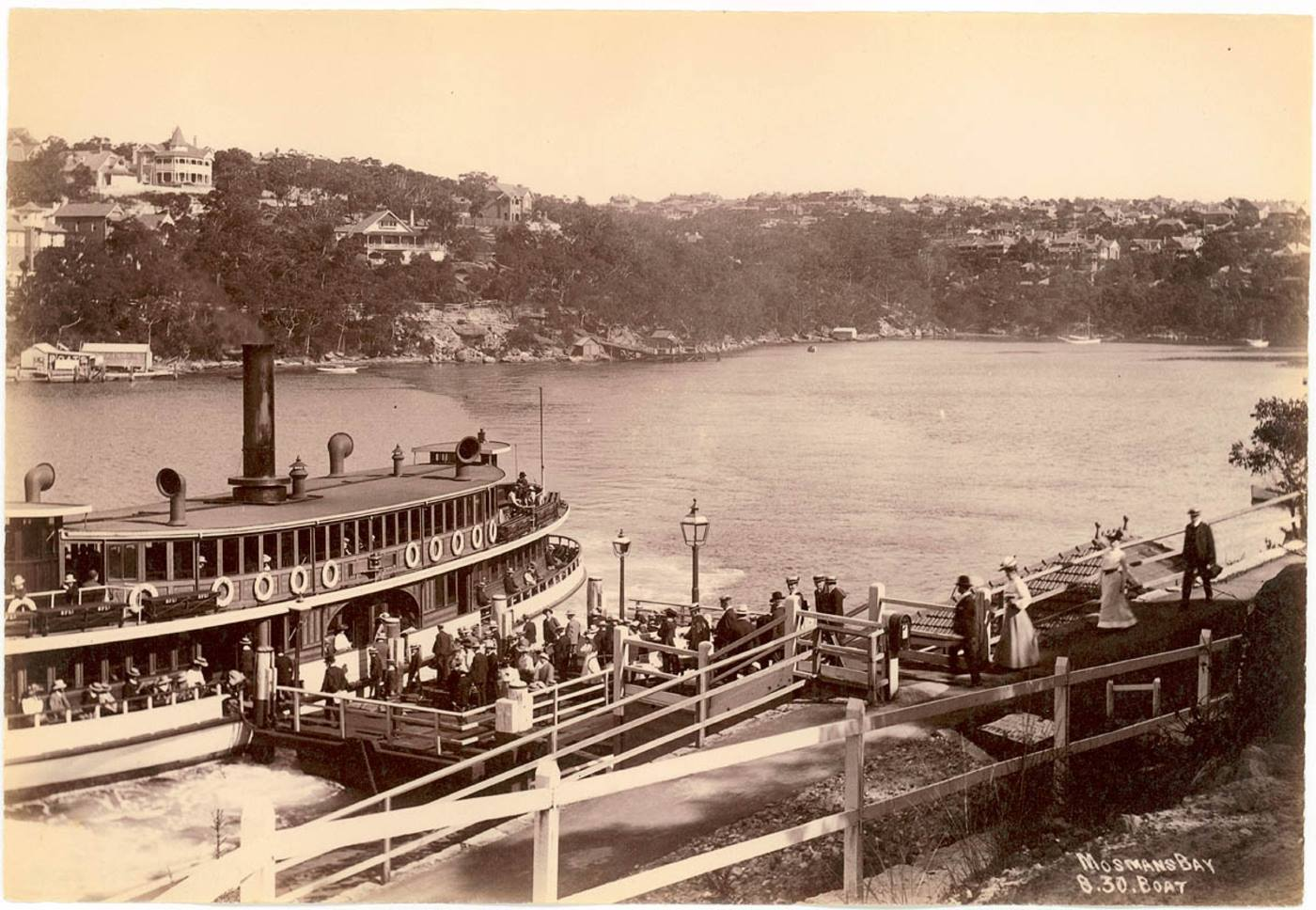
At Musgrave Street wharf (now "Mosman South") in her as built condition, 1910

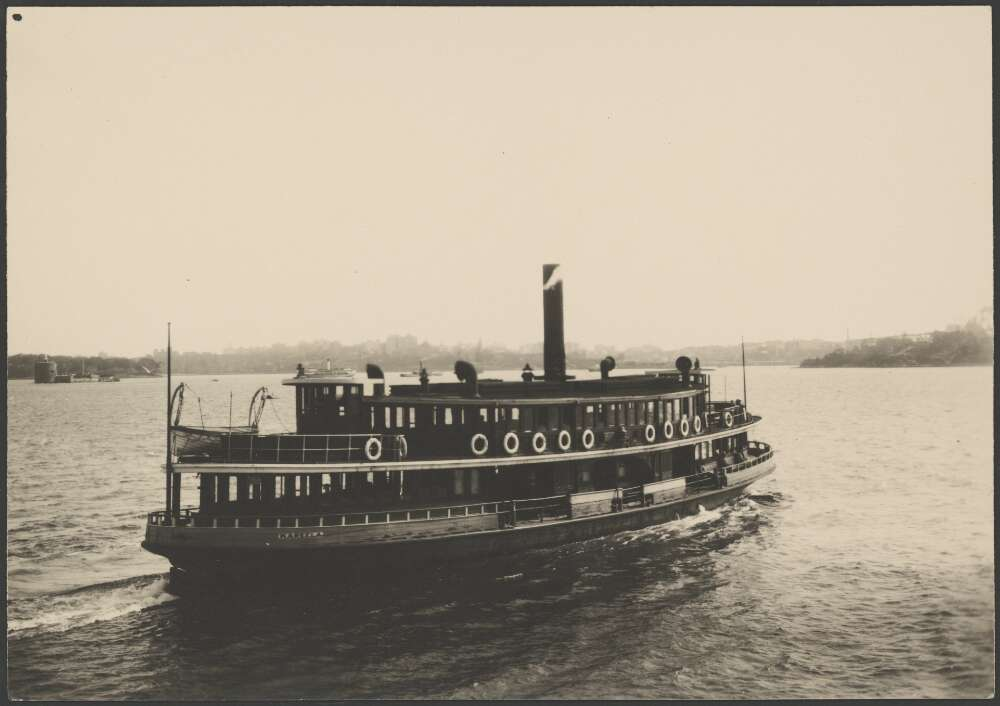
Near Cremorne Point with her 1920s livery, ca. 1930

In 1932, the Sydney Harbour Bridge was opened, and Sydney Ferries Ltd's annual patronage dropped from 40 million to about 15 million. Almost 20 Sydney Ferry Limited boats were put up for sale; however, Kareela was one of the boats kept on. The post-bridge drop in demand for the ferry fleet was somewhat mitigated, as many could not afford their own transport in the Great Depression of the 1930s and rationing of fuel during World War II made the coal required for the steam ferries relatively cheap.

However, the post-World War II years saw the drop in demand pick up pace. In 1951, with annual patronage down to 9 million, the New South Wales State Government took over Sydney Ferries Limited and its remaining fleet and assets. The Port Jackson and Manly Steamship Company, which ran the Manly service, was paid to run the services. The services and fleet were quickly rationalised, with most of the larger remaining timber K-class steamers being decommissioned. Kirrule, Kiandra, Kamiri and Kirawa were all broken up at this time. Kareela, however, was again retained in service. The reprieve was short-lived and in 1959, she was sold for breaking up after Kosciusko returned to service following her conversion to diesel power.

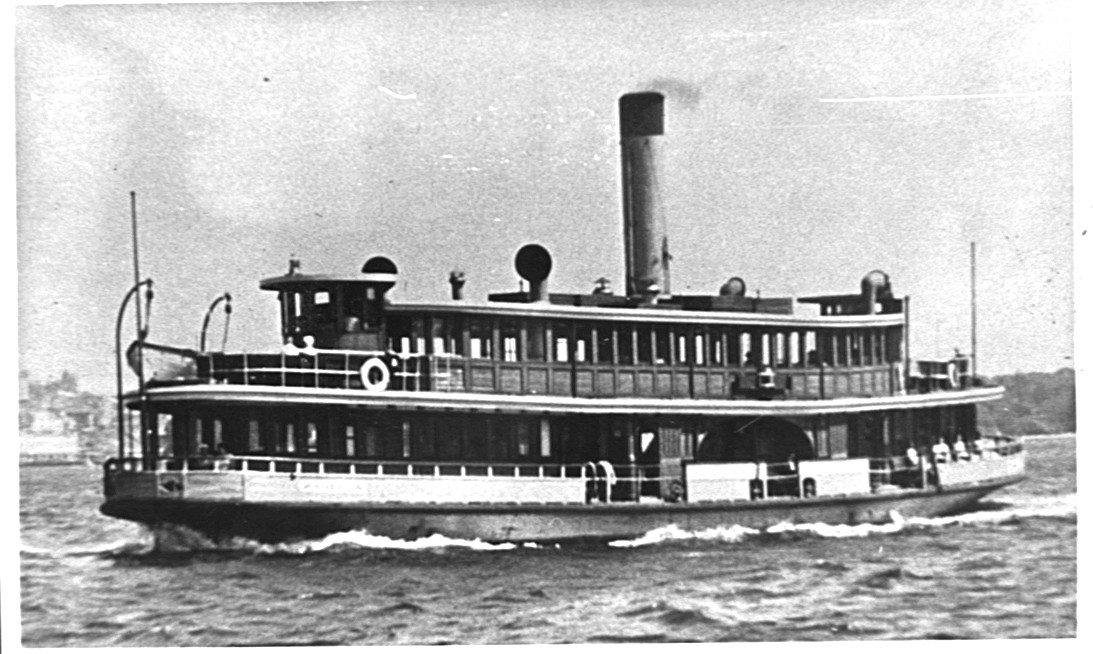
Steaming towards Cremorne Point, 1950s. Note the post-Harbour Bridge change from all black to cream with black top funnel

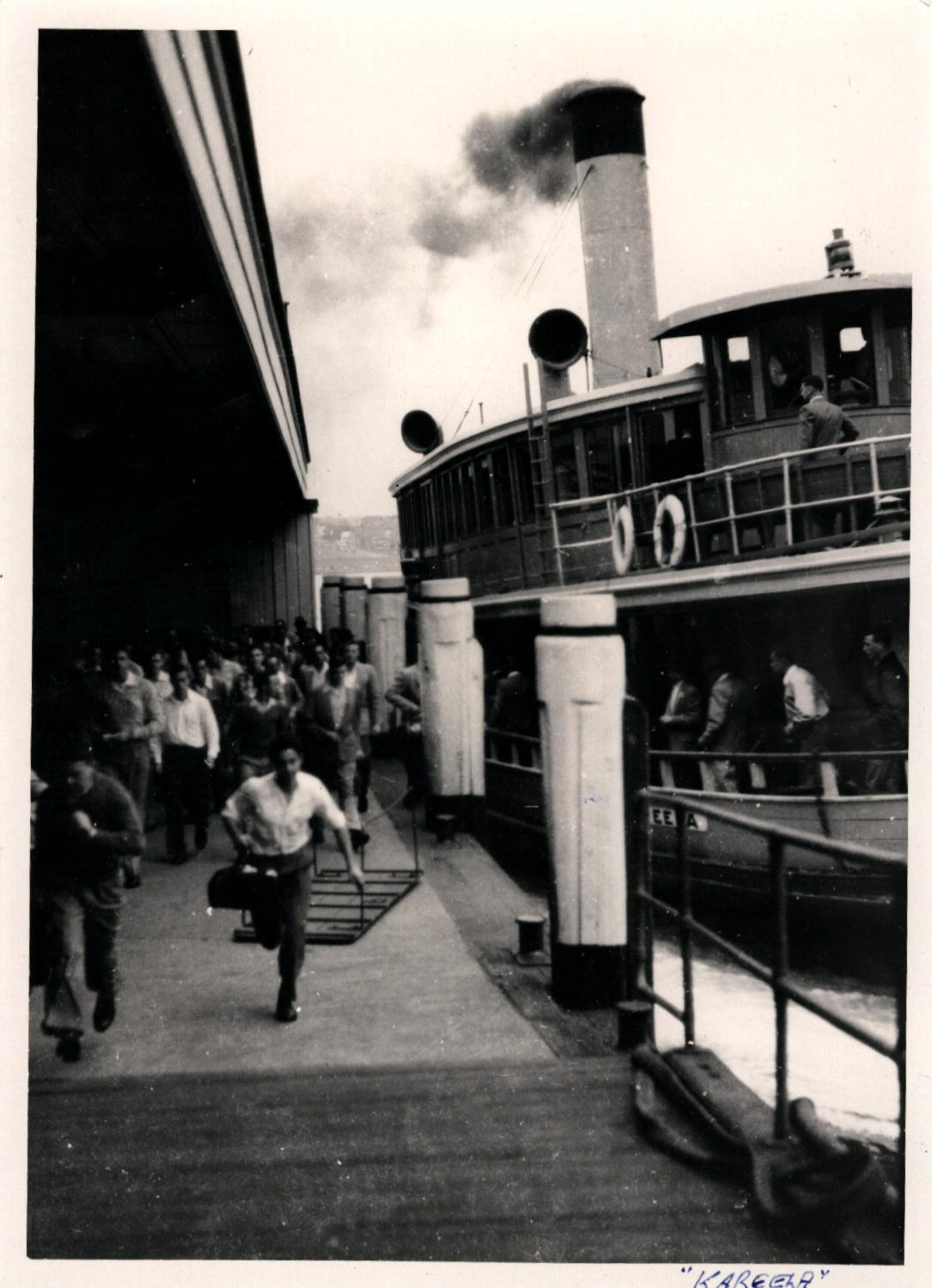
Arriving at Circular Quay, 1950s

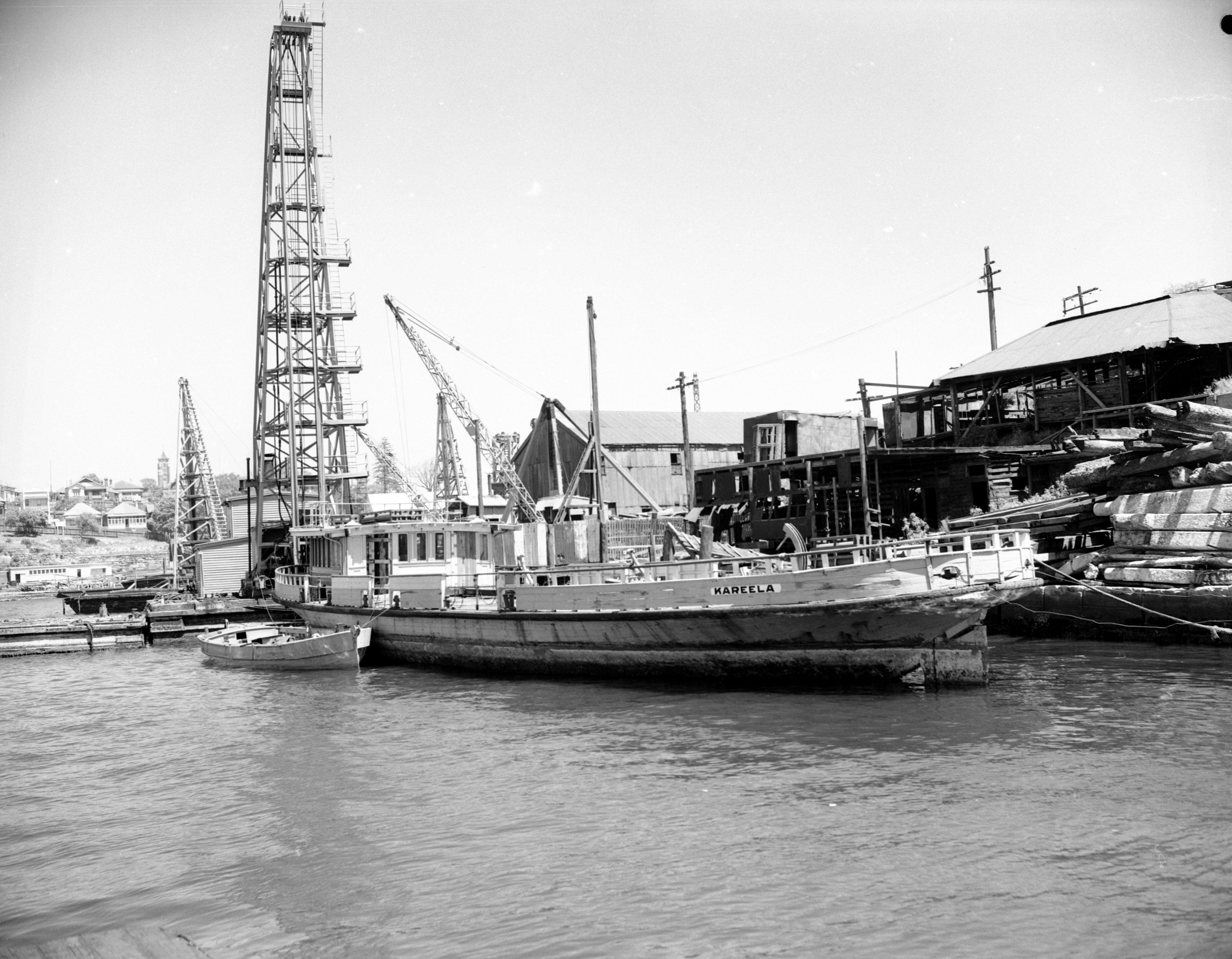
Being broken up at Balmain, December 1959

== Incidents ==
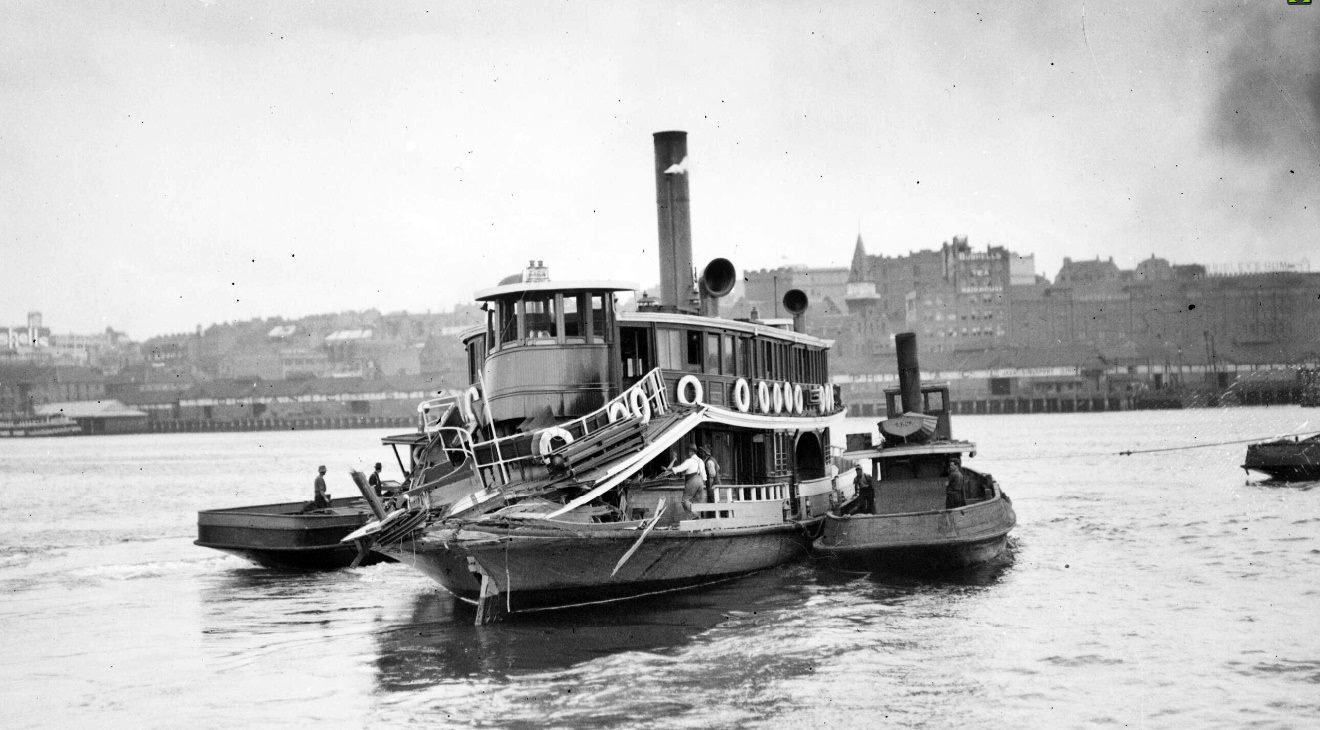
Kareela is towed from the old P&O wharf with which she collided, killing three passengers, on 28 August 1924

The worst incident in Kareela's career was on 28 August 1924, when she crashed into the P&O wharf on Bennelong Point, having just left Circular Quay for Taronga Zoo. A three week old baby, his mother and grandmother died. They, and other injured family members, had been sitting outside at the front of the ferry. The ferry hit with such force that the wharf deck sliced deep into the ferry under the roof of its main deck. The steering pole was smashed, much of the bulwarks ripped out, a lifeboat thrown onto the wharf, and much of the cabin's walls and windows were destroyed. The front part of the ferry's upper deck collapsed as it was later towed from the wharf. The ferry's hull, however, remained intact. The wharf also suffered significant damage, with decking smashed and four piles broken. Damage to the ferry was estimated at £600, while damage to the wharf was around £200. A jammed steering gear was found to be the cause, and the master's ticket was suspended for two years for not testing the wheel at departure.

Over the rest of her career, Kareela had other incidents, but none as serious as the fatal 1924 collision:

- On 29 January 1911, Kareela collided with the Balmain New Ferry Company steamer Lady Carrington near Bradleys Head. Both vessels were bound for the city and neither was carrying passengers. Much of Lady Carrington's starboard bulwark was torn away and she was withdrawn from service for repairs. Kareela suffered little damage and continued her trips that afternoon.
- In 1914, she collided with a then-new Barrenjoey.
- On 26 May 1921, she collided with the Manly ferry Balgowlah. Timber Kareela was badly damaged, but damage to the steel-hulled Balgowlah was minor.
- On 9 January 1924, whilst leaving Sydney Cove on a trip to Taronga Zoo, Kareela again collided with Barrenjoey, which was entering the Cove to berth at Circular Quay. The smaller, timber-built Kareela suffered significant damage to her port bow, while the larger steel Barrenjoey had damage to her sponson.
- Returning to Circular Quay with a weekend load of passengers from Taronga Zoo on 15 March 1930, she failed to stop and hit the retaining wall at speed, shattering both her bow timbers and the quay pavement. No passengers were hurt.
- On 28 October 1932, Kareela collided with the oil lighter, Voco, whilst traveling from Waterview Bay to McMahons Point to coal. The Voco sustained light damaged; however, 5 drums of oil were swept from the Voco, only four of which were recovered.
- On 2 August 1937, she ran into piles at Circular Quay, damaging her superstructure.

== See also ==
- List of Sydney Harbour ferries
- Timeline of Sydney Harbour ferries
