= Kanangra (ferry) =

Ferry formerly used in Sydney

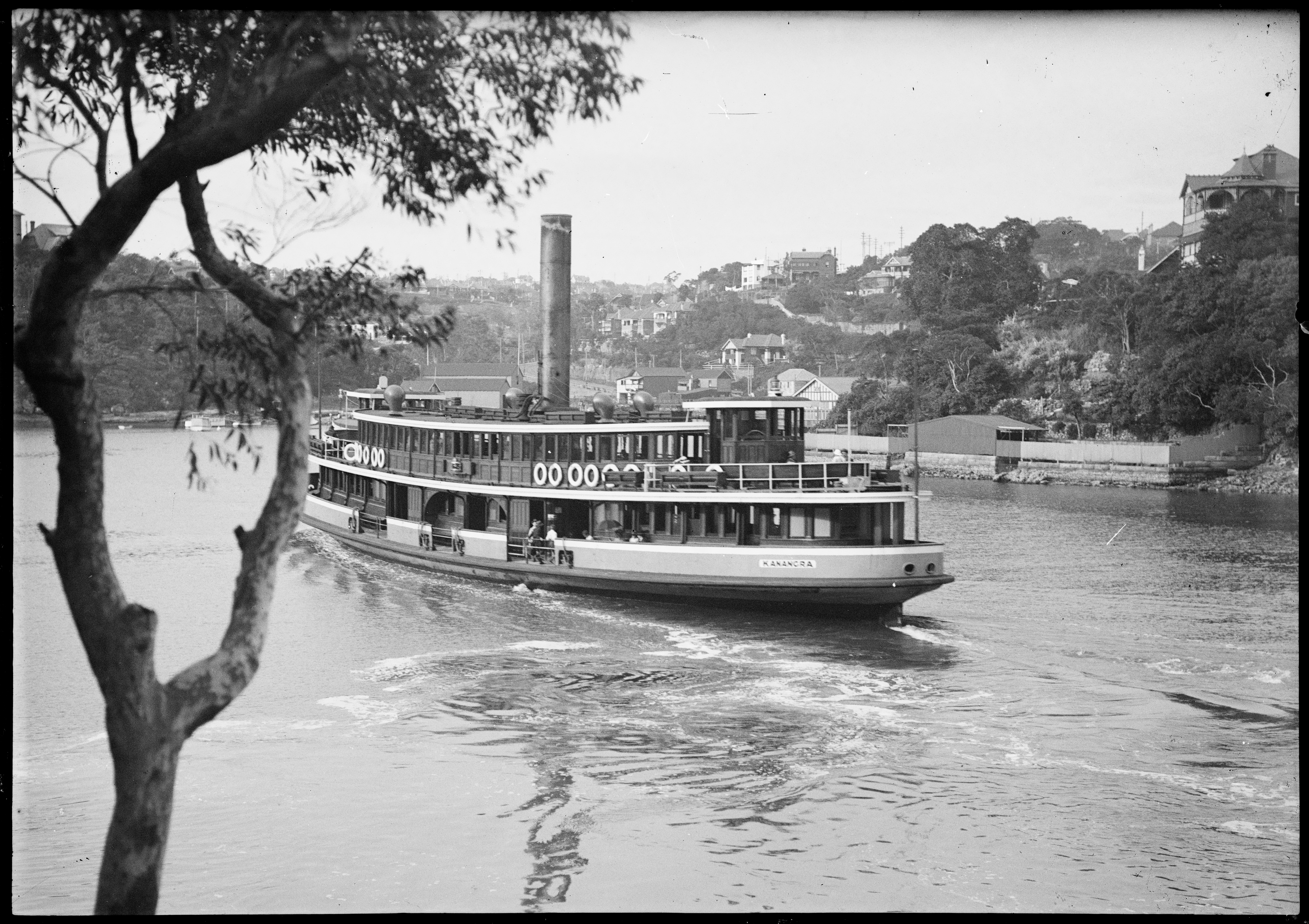
- Kanangra in Mosman Bay, 1910s

History
- Name: Kanangra
- Operator: Sydney Ferries Limited; Sydney Harbour Transport Board; Public Transport Commission; Urban Transit Authority
- Port of registry: Sydney
- Builder: Mort's Dock
- Cost: £17,873
- Launched: 14 August 1912
- Out of service: 1985
- Identification: 131544
- Fate: under restoration

General characteristics
- Tonnage: 295 tonnes
- Length: 45.7 m
- Beam: 9.7 m
- Decks: 2
- Propulsion: as built triple-expansion steam. Crossley diesel (from 1959)
- Capacity: 945

Kanangra is a retired ferry on Sydney Harbour. She was launched in 1912 during the early-twentieth century pre-Sydney Harbour Bridge boom years of Sydney Ferries Limited.

She and her close "sister" ferry, Kirawa (also 1912), were the first of four steel-hulled "K-class" ferries, the majority of which were timber-hulled. Both 45 metres in length and with passenger capacities of over 1,000 passengers each, the two were among the largest of the Sydney Ferries Limited fleet and they mainly served the busy Cremorne and Mosman routes.

Kanangra was retired as a ferry in 1985 and is moored at Rozelle Bay as part of the Sydney Heritage Fleet and is undergoing restoration. It is the last remaining ferry built for Sydney Ferries Limited in the early twentieth century pre-Sydney Harbour Bridge peak.

Sydney Ferries Limited generally chose Australian Aboriginal names for the early twentieth "K-class" steamers. "Kanangra" is thought to mean "beautiful view".

== Background ==
Kanangra was built for Sydney Ferries Limited during the early twentieth century boom in cross-Harbour travel prior to the 1932 opening of the Sydney Harbour Bridge. At the time, the company ran one of the largest ferry fleets in the world. The two ferries were part of a broader type of around 25 double-ended timber screw ferries - the Sydney K-class ferries - that the company commissioned between the 1890s and early 1920s to meet the booming demand. She was one of five 1,000-passenger vessels built for Sydney ferries between 1910 and 1912 for the busy Cremorne and Mosman routes. The other four being near identical sister Kirawa and the three timber-hulled, but otherwise similar, Kirrule-type ferries, namely Kirrule (1910), Kiandra (1911), and Kubu (1912).

Kanangra followed the Sydney Ferries Limited convention of naming their vessels after Australian Aboriginal words starting with "K". "Kanangra" is thought to mean "beautiful view".

== Design and construction ==
Kanangra, and sister Kirawa, were built by Mort's Dock at their Woolwich yard for Sydney Ferries Limited for a cost of £17,873 each. Unlike the previous K-class ferries that were timber-hulled, the two had riveted steel hulls, although their decks and superstructures were timber. They were built with five watertight bulkheads.

As built, Kanangra was 47.2 m in length and had a beam of 9.5 m. Her original triple expansion team engines had cylinders of 14, 22¼ and 37 inches in diameter respectively with a stroke of 21 inches. Steam was supplied by two large navy type boilers, fitted with corrugated furnaces and a working pressure of 180lb. Among the auxiliaries were an independent centrifugal circulating pump, automatic feed pump, feed heater filter. The indicated horsepower was about 650.

Kanangra was launched on 14 August 1912 and christened by Dorothea Walker, daughter of FW Walker of the Illawarra and South Coast Company. She was towed to the company's Balmain yard where, at the time of launch, sister Kirawa, which had been launched in July, was nearby being fitted out. Her official trials were held on 24 January 1913 where she achieved a speed of over 13 knots.

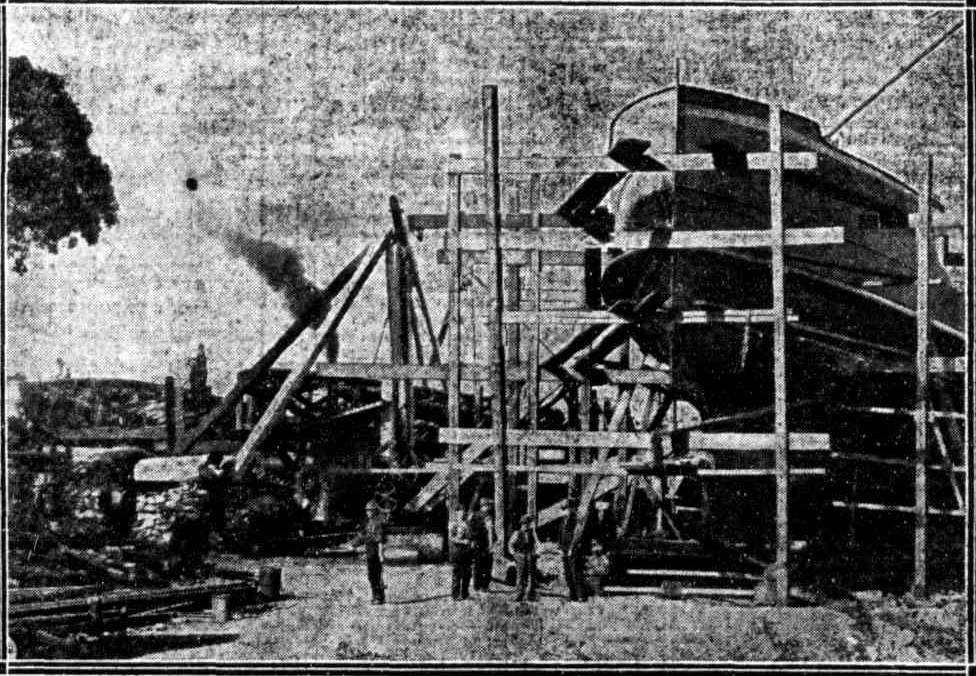
Kanangra under construction with Port Jackson and Manly Steamship Company ferry, Balgowlah (right) and sister Kirawa, May 1912

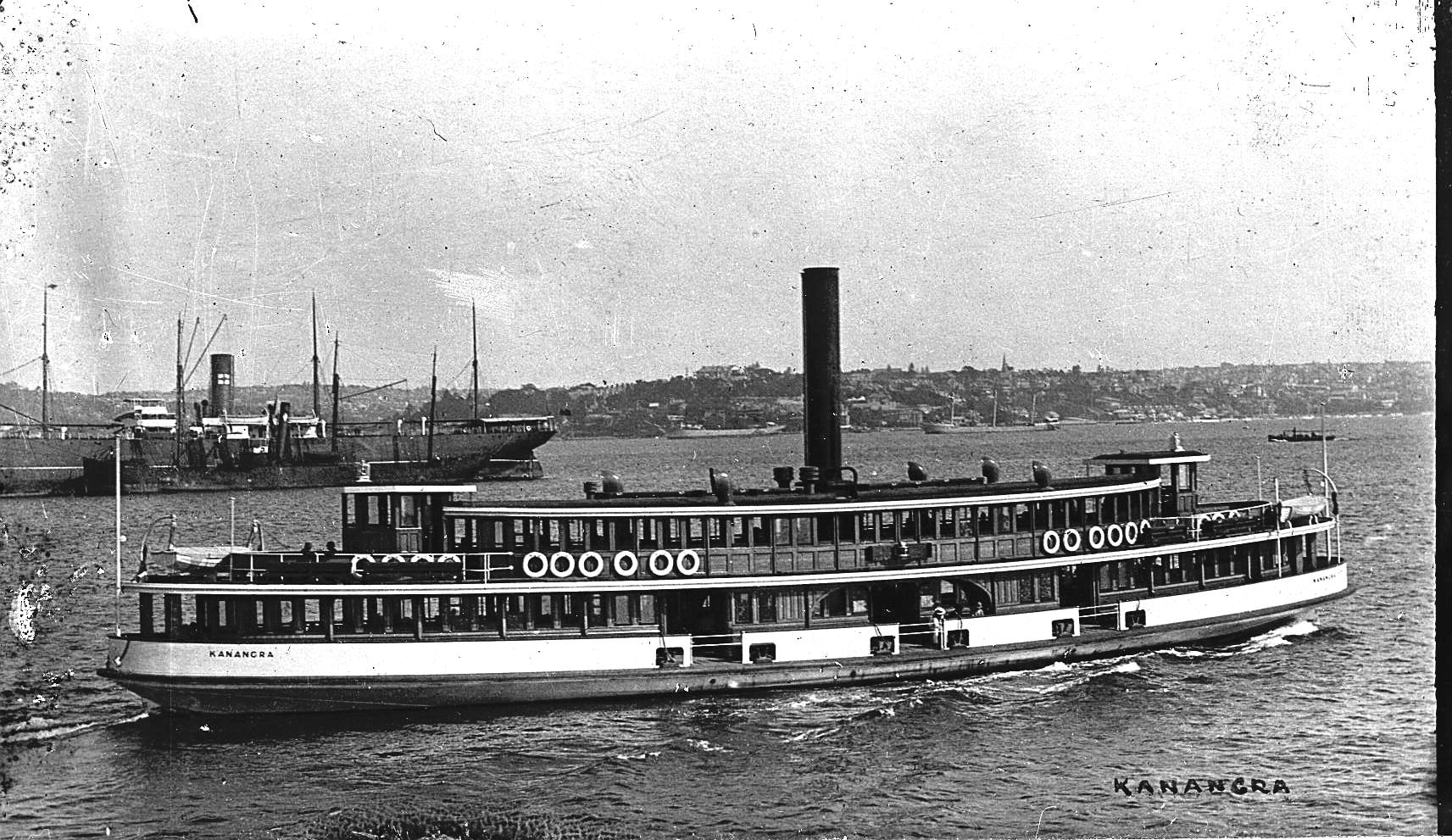
Kanangra as built on Sydney Harbour, 1910s

== Steam ferry (1912 - 1959) ==
Kanangra and Kirawa were primarily used on the Mosman and Cremorne services. Demand for ferry services across the harbour were booming in the early 20th century, and in 1911, Sydney Ferries Limited had begun services to the new Cremorne Wharf with new tram connection.

Prior to the 1932 opening of the Sydney Harbour Bridge, Sydney Ferries Limited had transported 40 million passengers a year. This dropped to 15 million after the bridge opening. Both Kanangra and Kirawa were kept in service after the 1932 opening of the Sydney Harbour Bridge whereas many vessels were decommissioned due to the drop in demand. The drop in demand for the remaining ferry fleet, including Kanangra and Kirawa, was somewhat mitigated as many could not afford their own transport in the Great Depression of the 1930s and rationing of fuel during World War 2 made the coal required for the steam ferries relatively cheap.

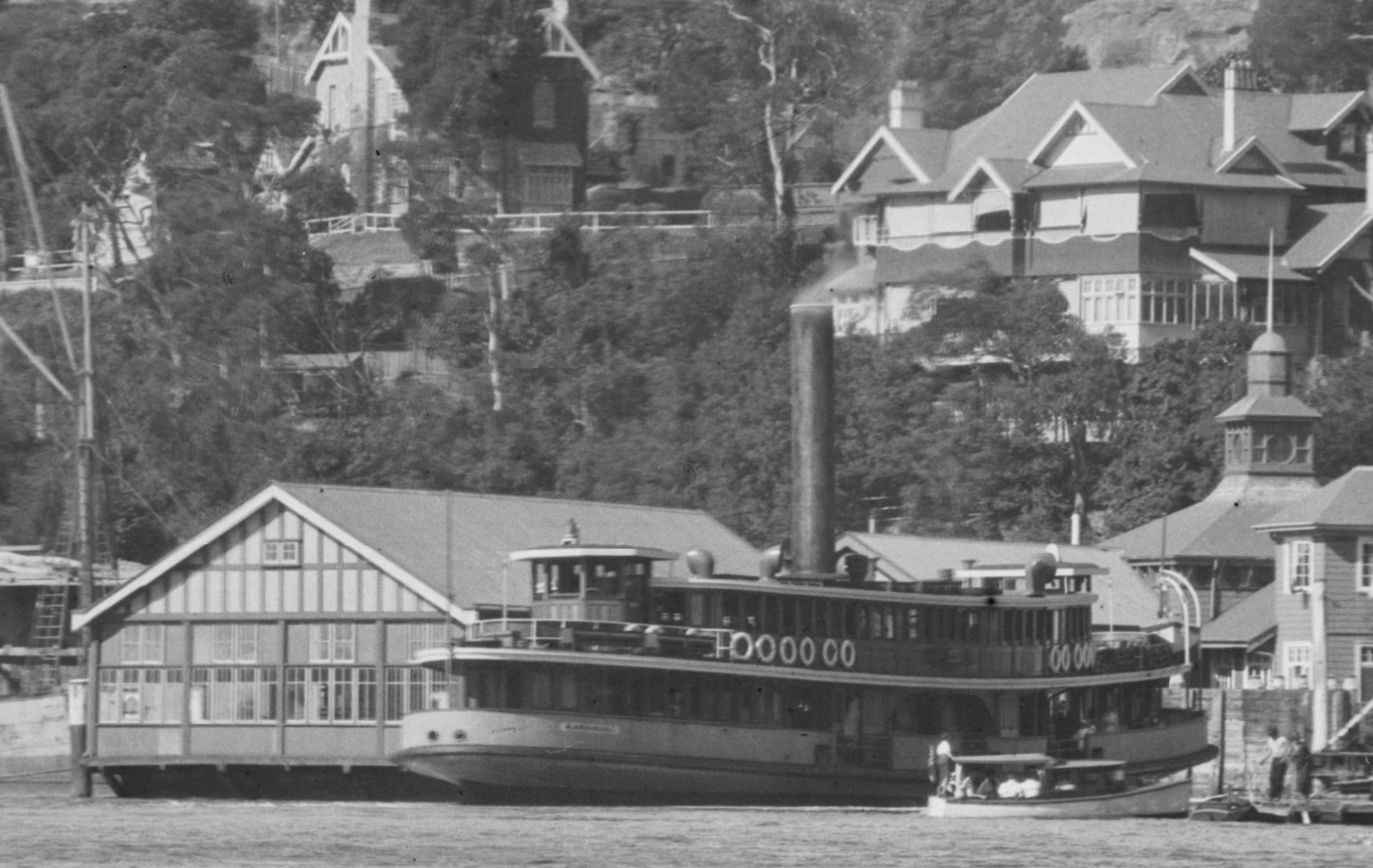
At Mosman Bay, circa 1917

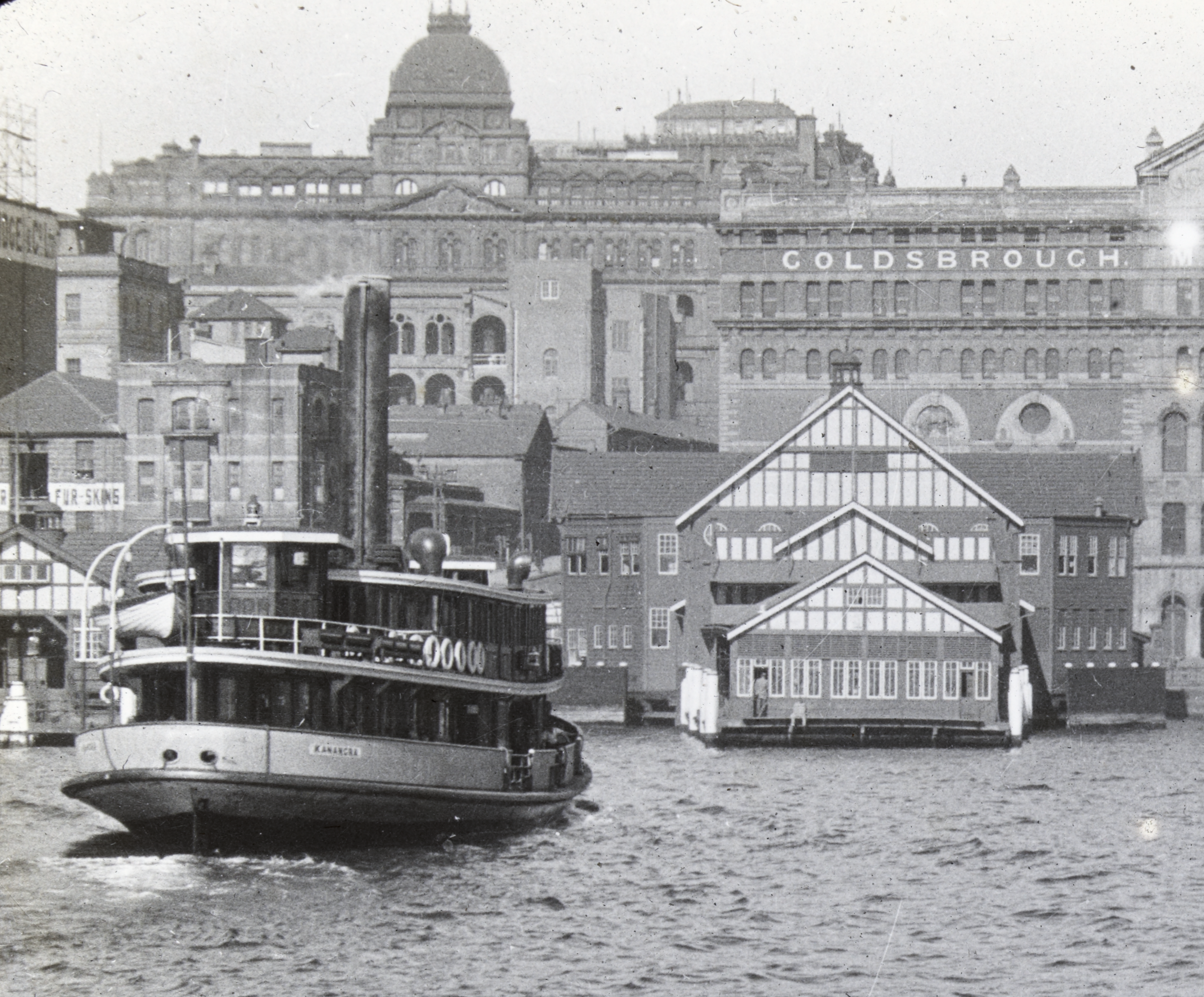
Approaching Circular Quay, 1910s or 1920s

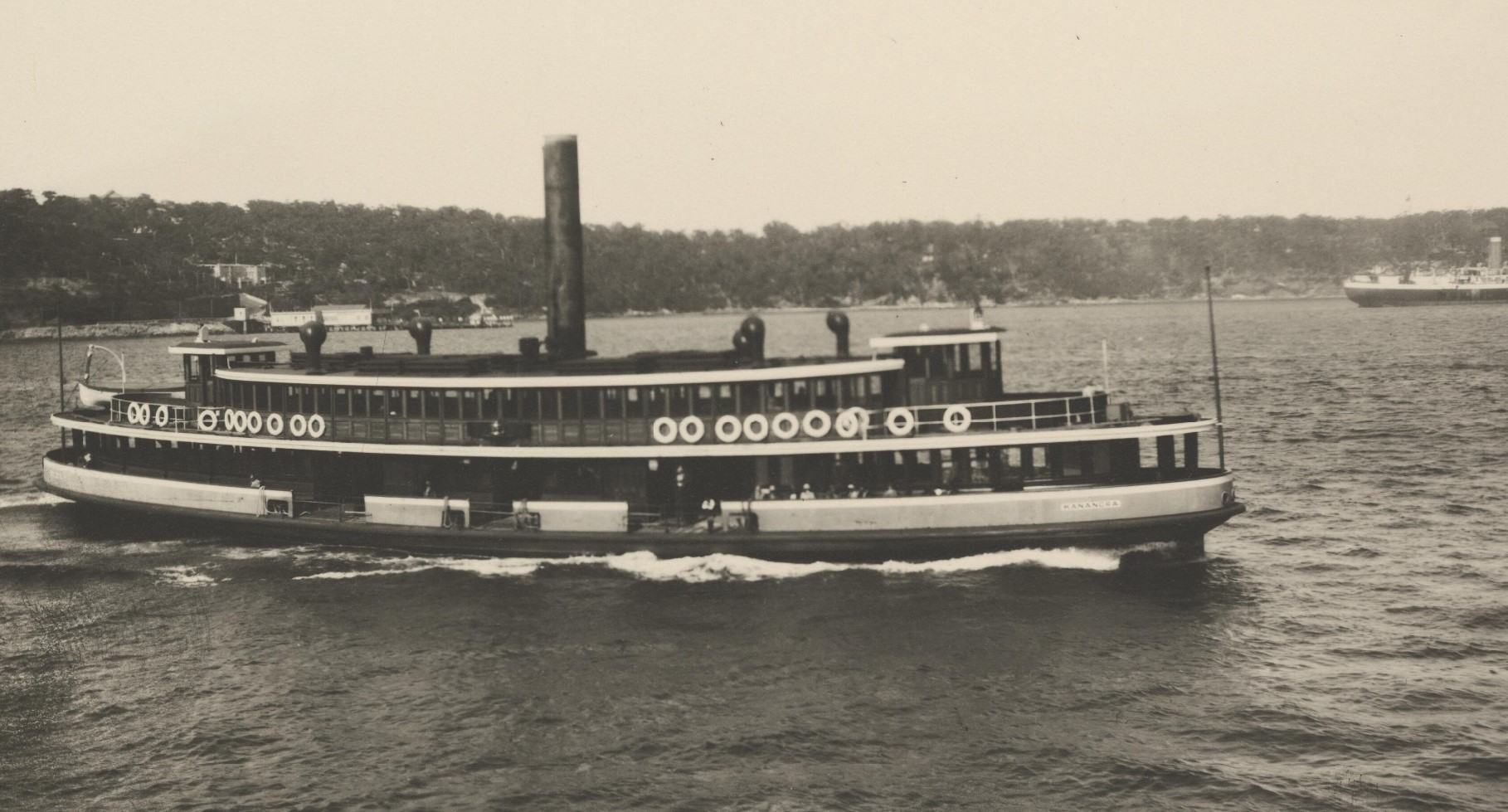
Rounding Cremorne Point late 1920s or early 1930s

In 1951, as the demand for ferry services dropped further to 9 million following the end of the war, the NSW State Government took over Sydney Ferries Limited and its remaining fleet and assets. The Port Jackson and Manly Steamship Company, which ran the Manly service, was paid to run the services. The services and fleet were quickly rationalised with most of the larger remaining timber K-class steamers being decommissioned. A number of the smaller coal burners were converted to diesel (including Kameruka and Kosciusko).

Kirawa was laid up at the time in need of a new boiler. As there was no longer need for two large ferries, she was sold to be broken up in 1953.

Kanangra was taken out of service in 1951 for a major refit and was returned to service in 1953. She was too costly to replace, indeed, many other surplus ferries were being scrapped. Kanangra's master of 30 years, Captain William Martin, collapsed and died of a cerebral haemorrhage at the helm of Kubu in 1953 while Kanangra was undergoing her refit.

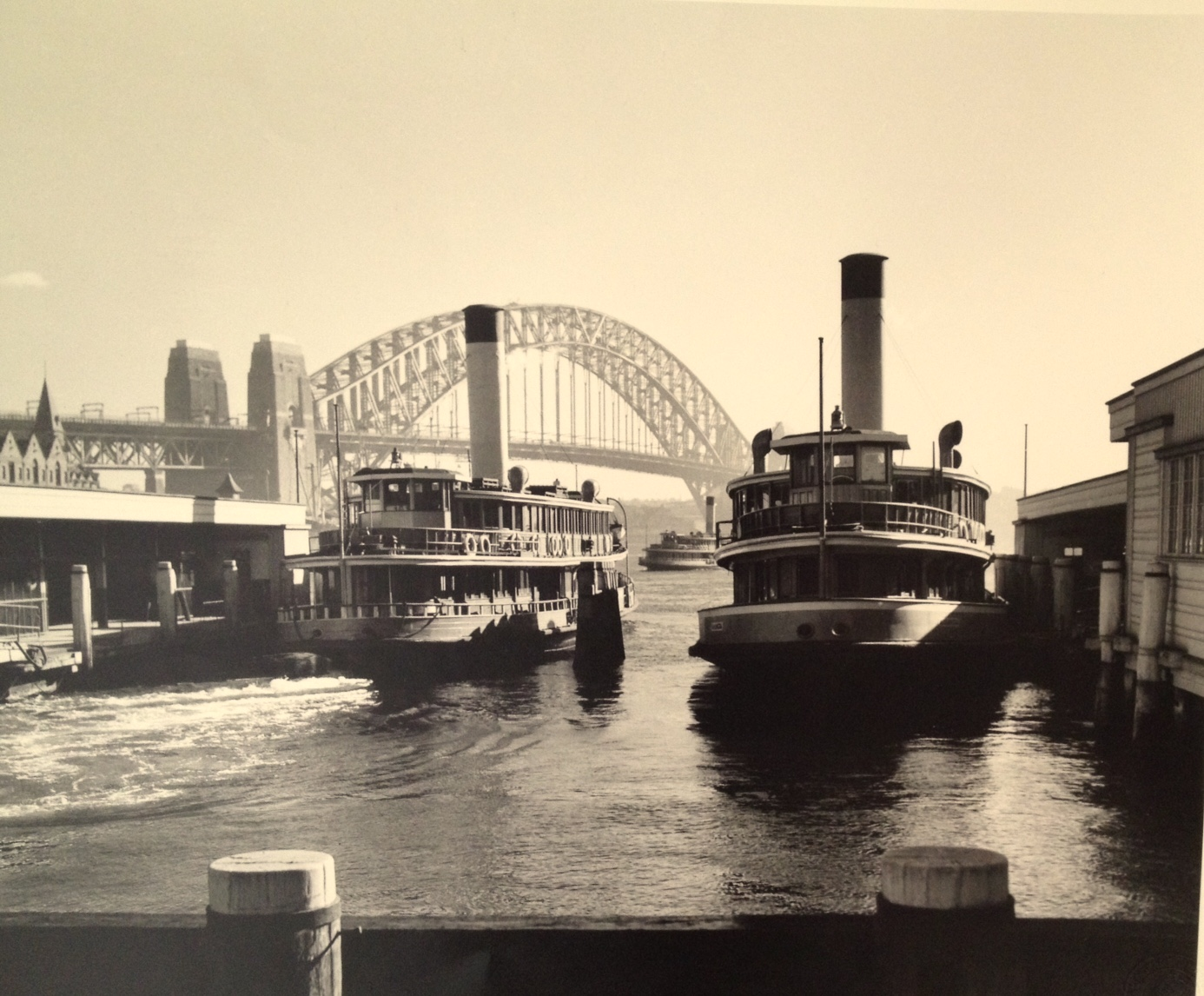
At Circular Quay with Kubu, photo by Max Dupain

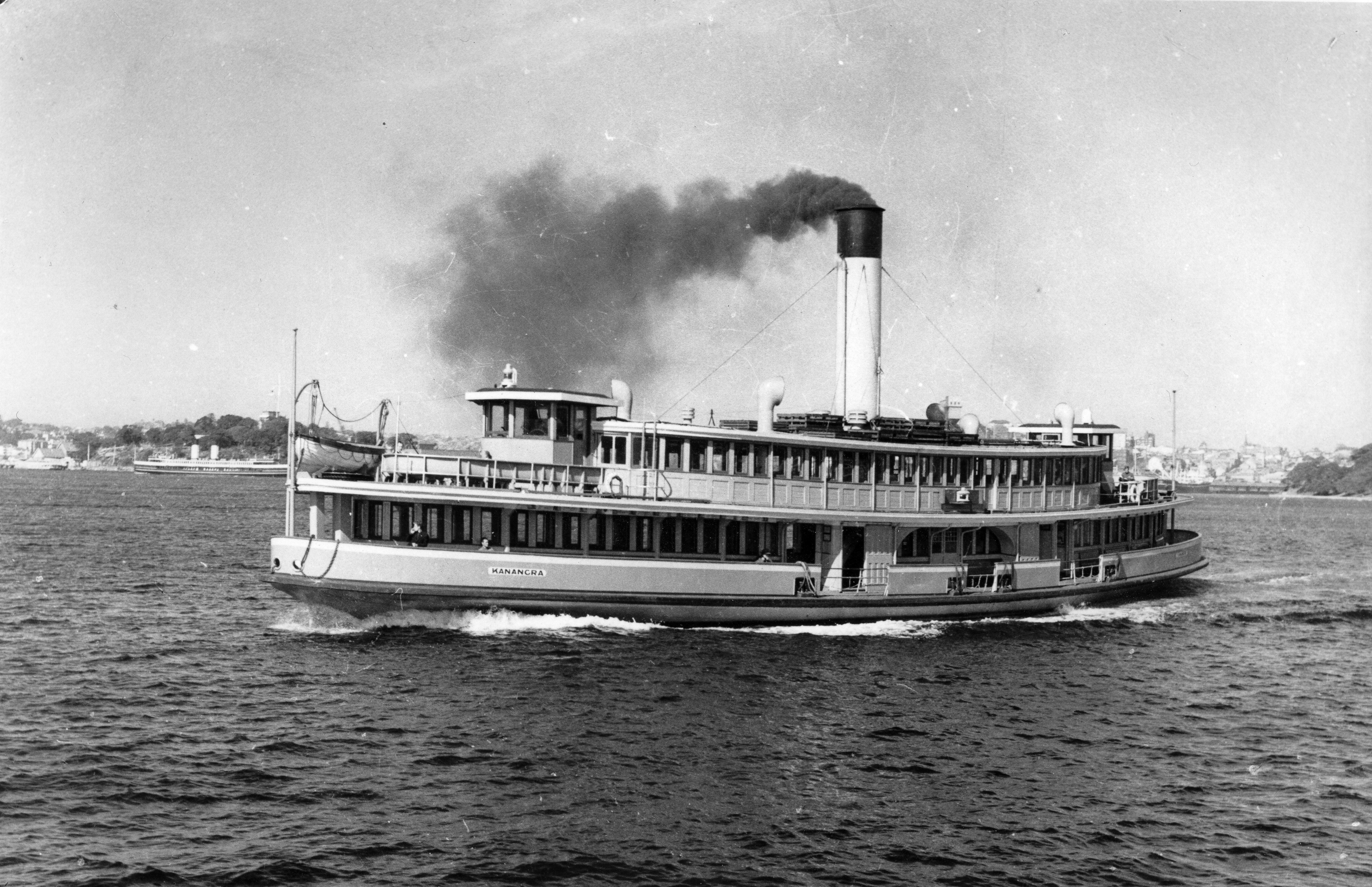

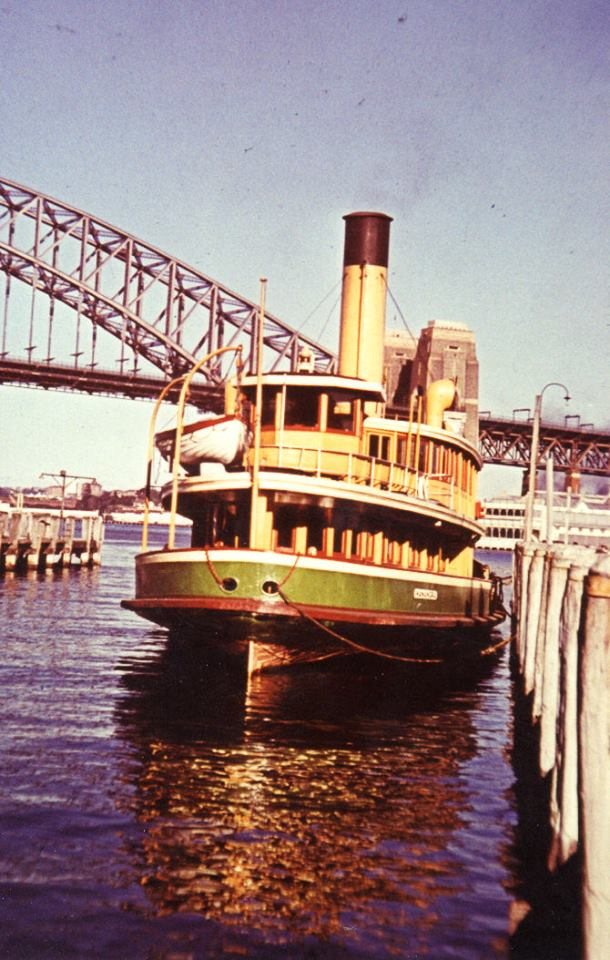
In her 1930s yellow and green scheme

== Diesel ferry (1959 - 1985) ==
On 1 May 1959, she made her last trip as a steamer on the 5:35 pm Circular Quay - Mosman - Cremorne run. She was converted to diesel power with a single direct coupled eight cylinder Crossley engine driving a fore and aft propeller. Her tall smoke stack was replaced with a smaller exhaust funnel, and the boilers became the fuel tanks. She was the last of the Sydney Harbour steam ferries to be converted to diesel. Her re-entry to service allowed the last of the coal-fired steamers, Kubu, to be retired.

Kanangra participated in the "Great Ferry Boat Race" during the early and mid 1980s coming second in the inaugural 1980 event.

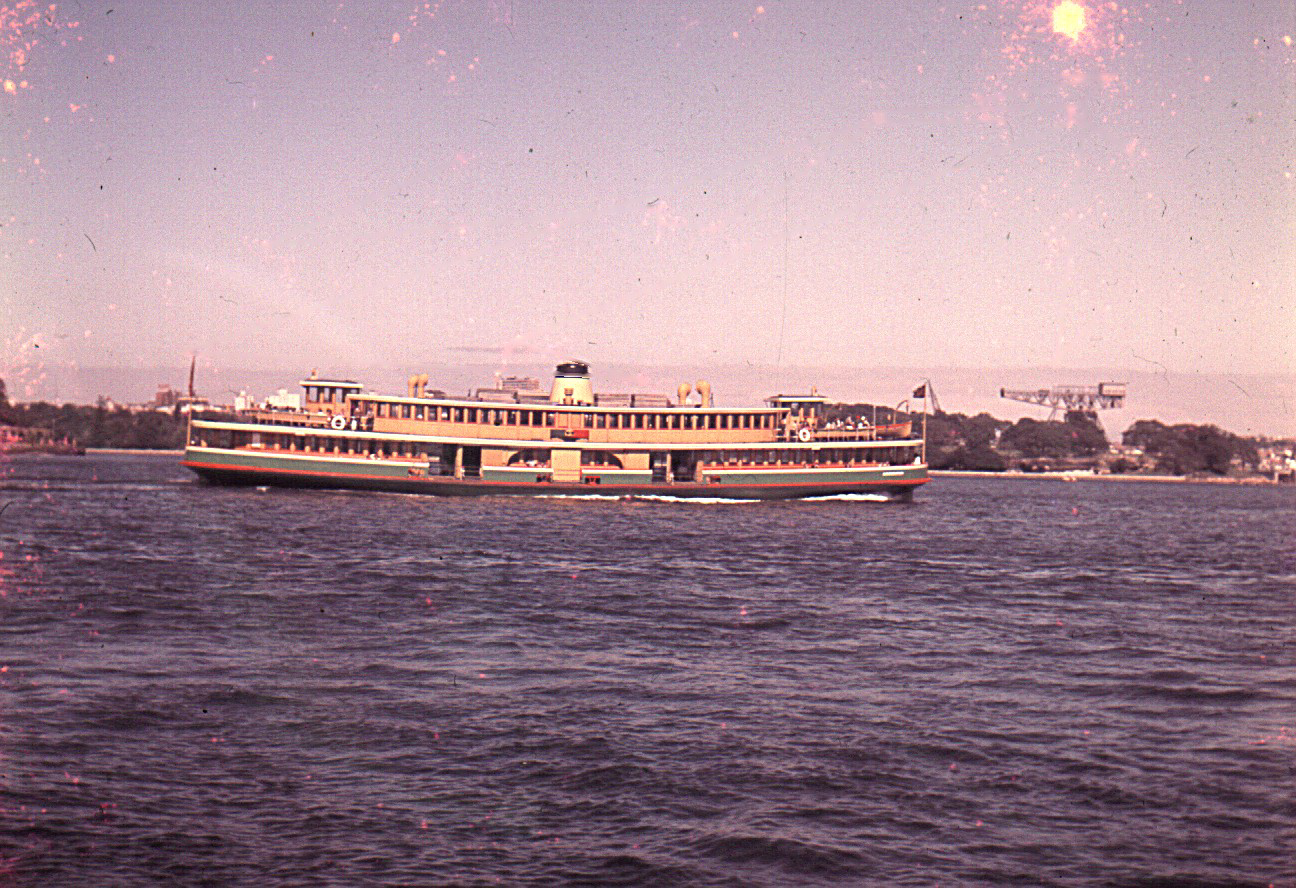
In her 1930s/40s colour scheme following conversion to diesel, 1960

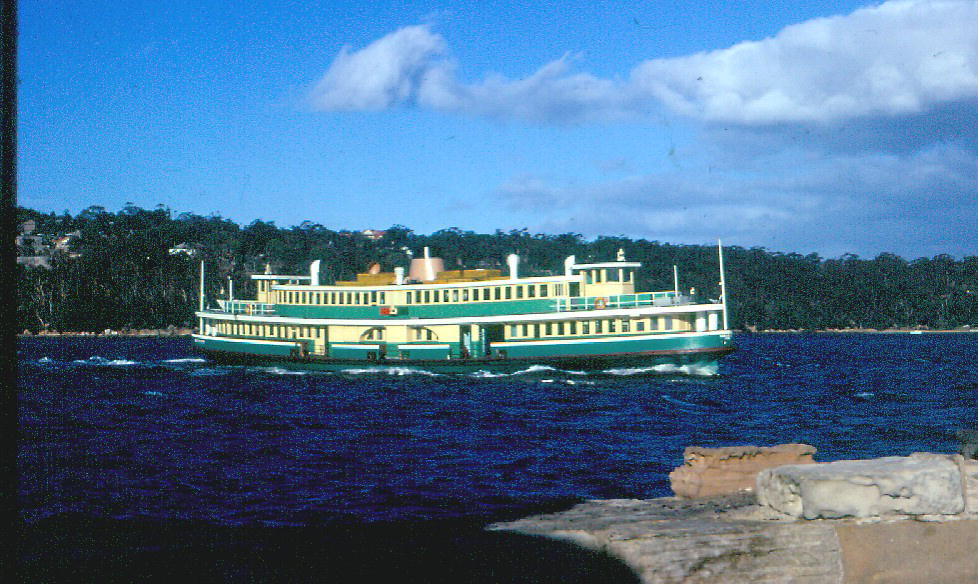
Kanangra as a diesel vessel and in her 1960s green and cream Public Transport Commission colours, 1971

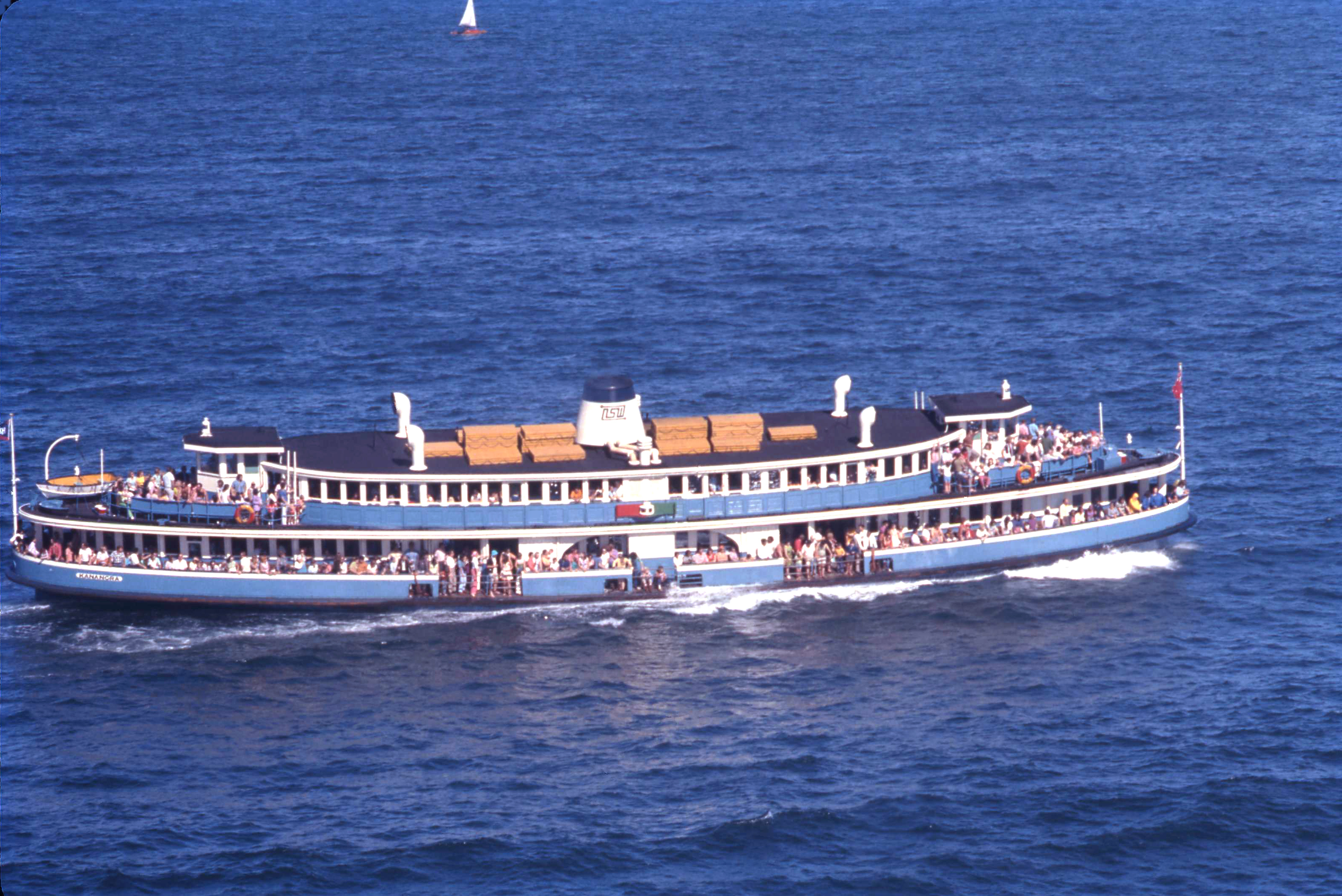
Kanangra in her blue Public Transport Commission colours on a Harbour Cruise, 1970s

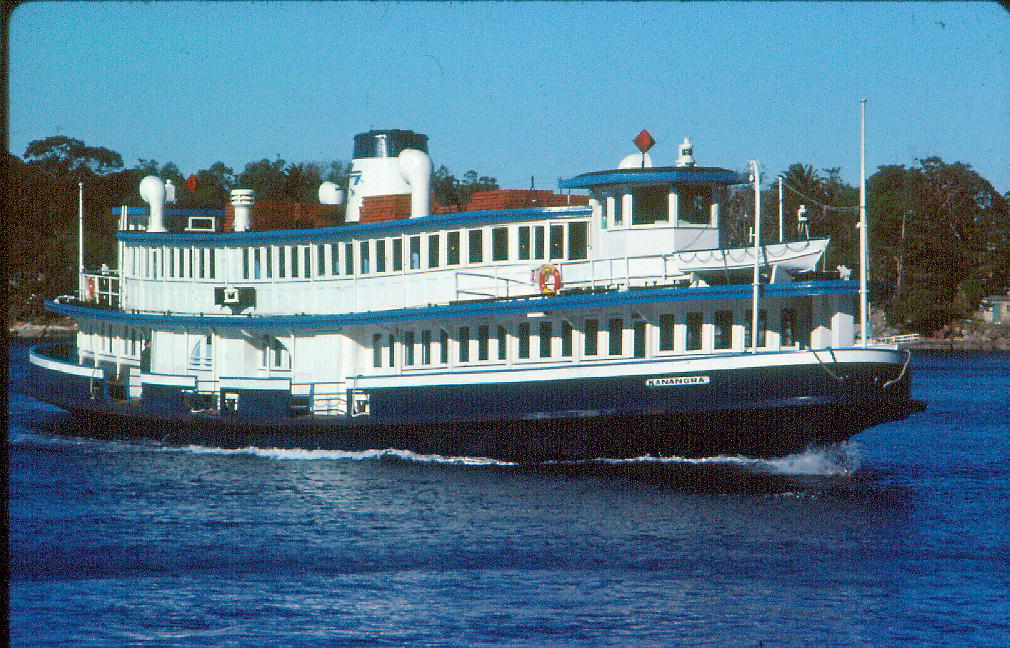
Kanangra in Mosman Bay near Cremorne Point post conversion to diesel (note smaller funnel) and in Urban Transit Authority colours, 1979

== Retirement (1985 - ) ==
One of the longest serving ferries on Sydney Harbour, Kanangra was withdrawn from service in 1985 and moored adjacent to the Pyrmont Bridge in Darling Harbour. After plans to restore her as a steam powered vessel as a Bicentennial project were dropped due to high expense, she was donated to the Sydney Heritage Fleet in 1987. The Kanangra Restoration Committee was established in 2001. The Fleet plan a full restoration of Kanangra to her 1960s period retaining the diesel configuration. An ultrasound hull survey was conducted in 2002. An urgent program of hull stabilisation has been completed. In 2009, she was placed on the Australian Register of Historic Vessels. In April 2022 she was towed to Captain Cook Graving Dock at Garden Island to be re-floated on the Sea Heritage Dock in place of John Oxley. She returned to Rozelle Bay on 14 April 2022, to commence the next phase in her restoration by Sydney Heritage Fleet volunteers and staff.

The restoration has a projected completion date of 2032.

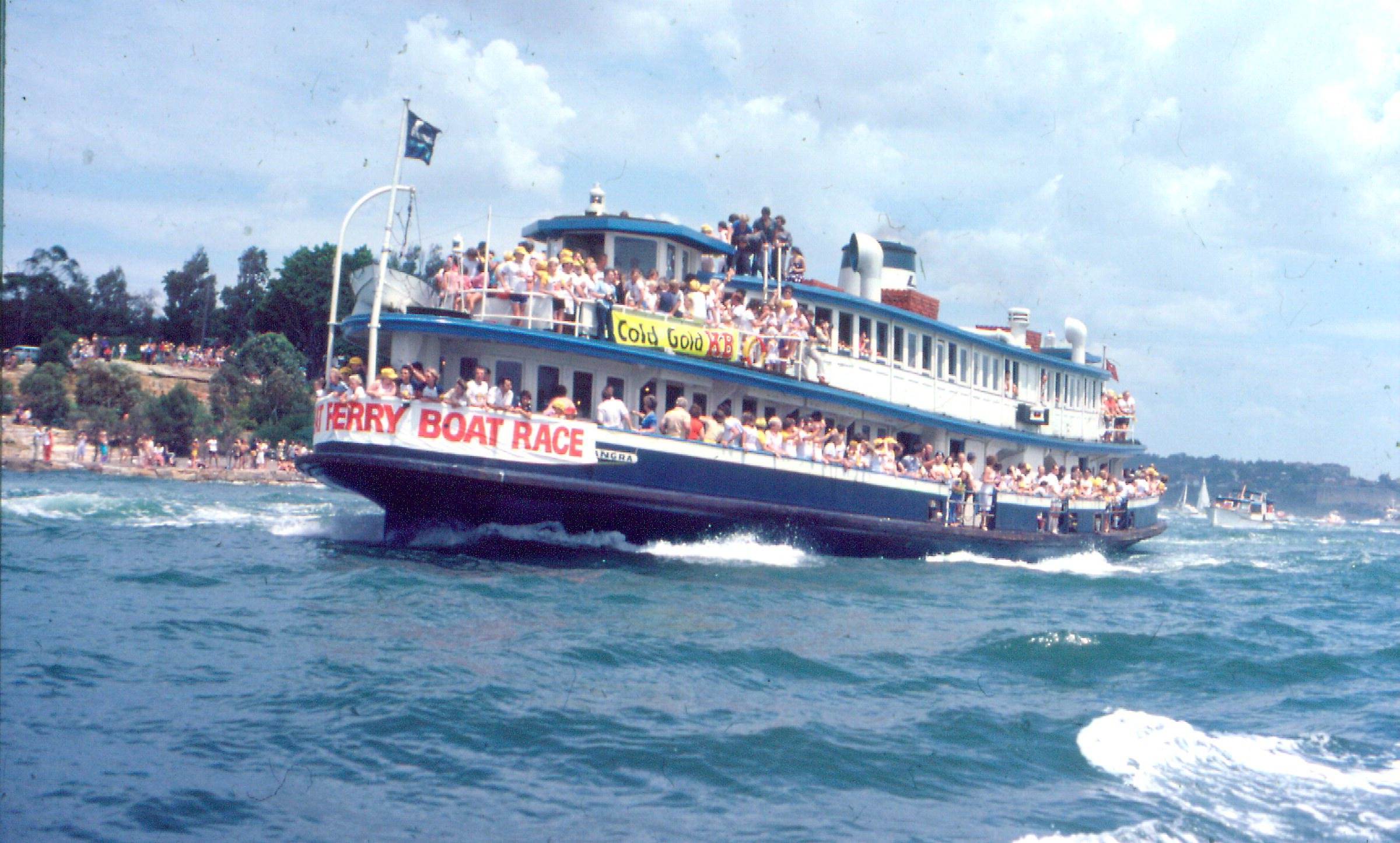
68 years into her service career and five years from retirement, Kanangra came second in the inaugural Great Ferry Boat Race, 1980

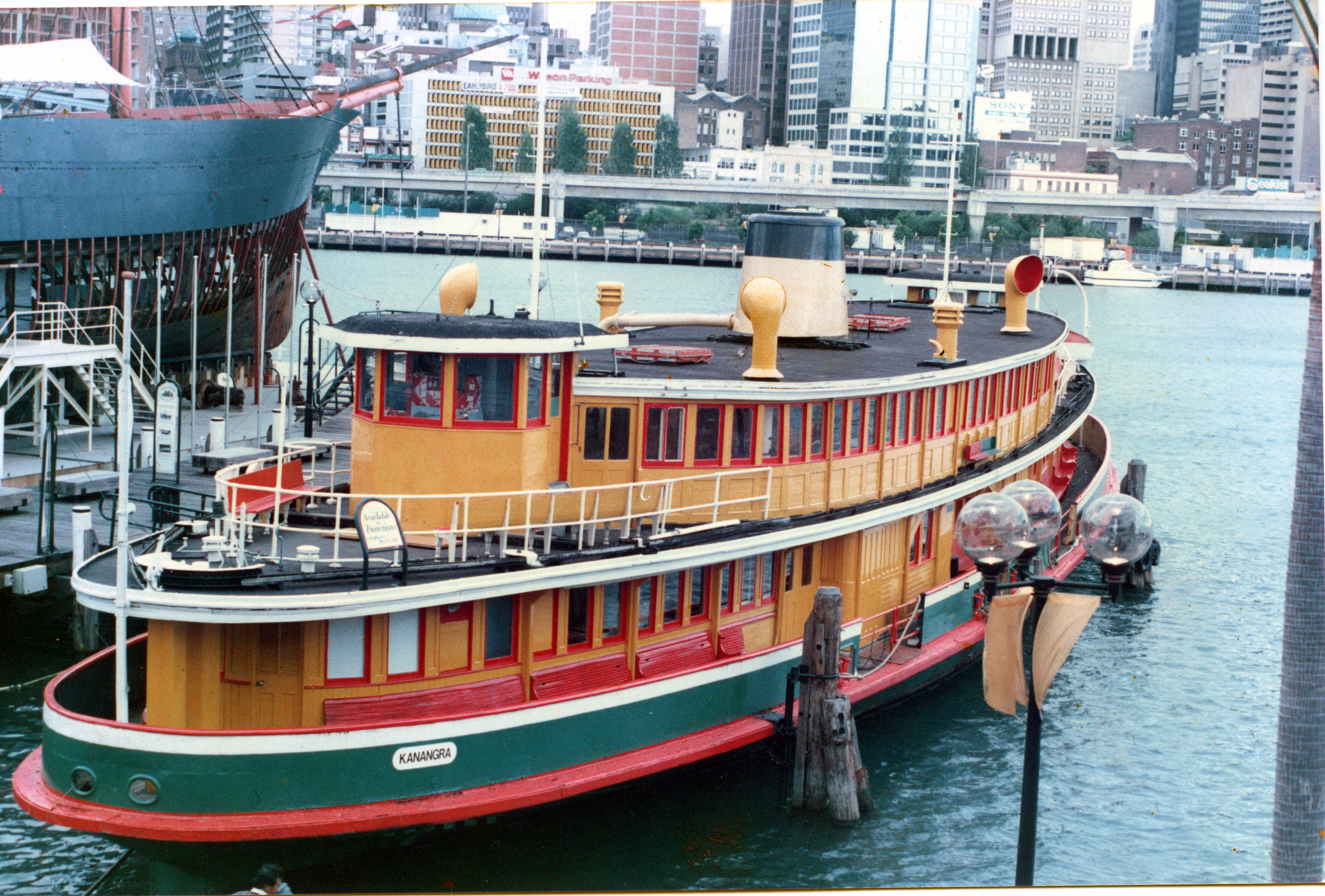
Kanangra as an exhibition vessel in Darling Harbour from late 1980s, with restored 1930s livery.

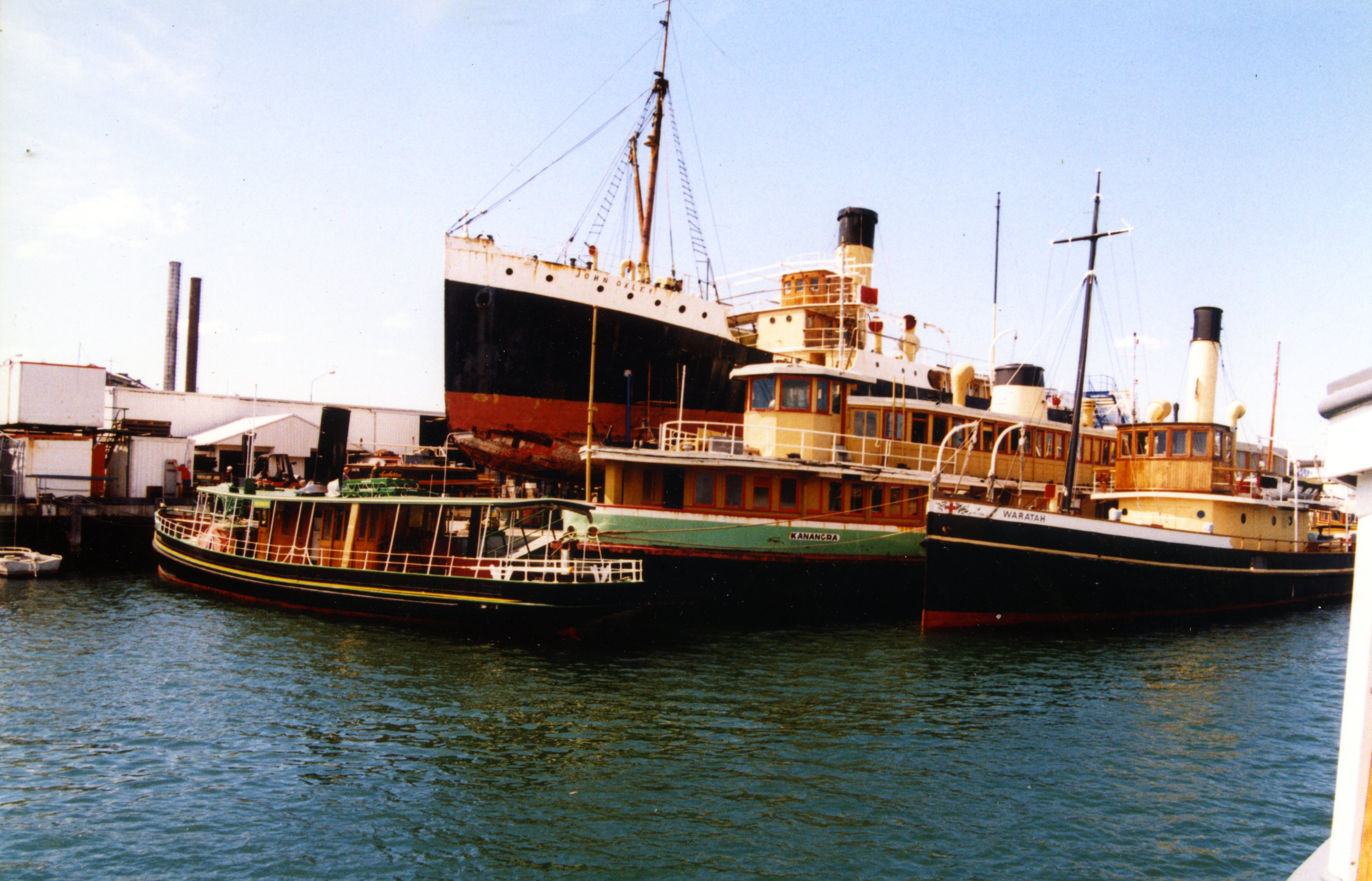
With Sydney Heritage Fleet vessels, Lady Hopetoun, John Oxley, and Waratah

== Incidents ==
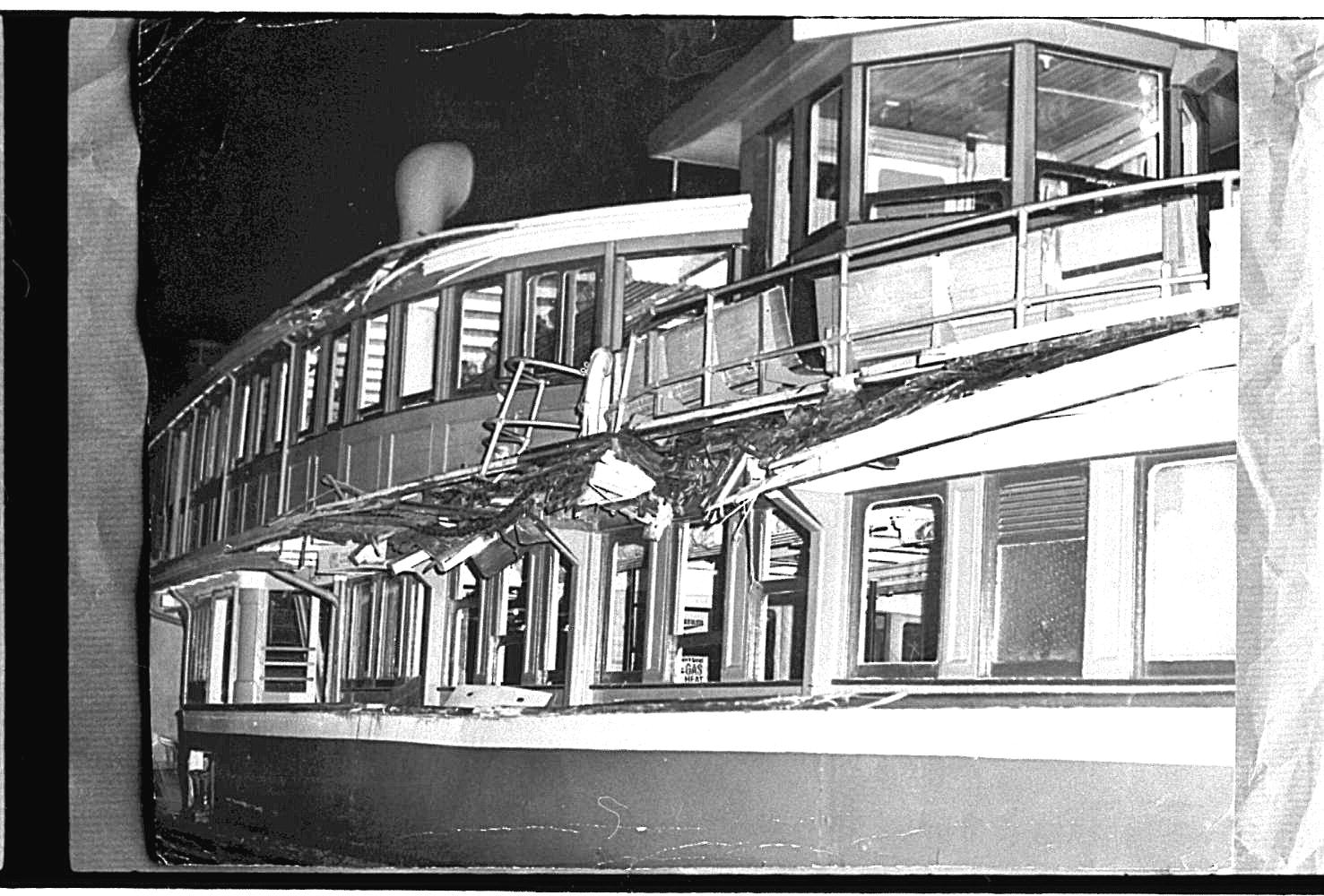
Kanangra damaged in collision with Japanese freighter Awata Maru, June 1964

- 9 December 1922 - While in Mosman Bay, Kanangra's roof caught on fire but extinguished by the crew.
- July 1923, Kanangra crashed into a wharf.
- 1924 - Kanangra was one of the first boats and the scene of ferry Kareela's fatal collision at east Circular Quay and offloaded the latter's passengers.
- March 1926, Kanangra collided with ferry Lady Carrington.
- 9 December 1927 - Kirawa collided with sister Kanangra off Cremorne Point. Several women fainted, but the excitement was reported to have died down when it was determined that little damage had been done.
- 30 January 1935 - Kanangra collided with Kubu at Circular Quay. Both ferries were empty and suffered damage.
- 1936 - During an excursion trip to Clifton Gardens, newly launched luxury cruiser, Waroo, caught fire. The cabin was a mass of flames and the two men on board were powerless to stop the flames. The Kanangra's crew pulled the ferry alongside the cruiser to assist extinguish the fierce fire, throwing buckets and a fire extinguisher to the men. The ferry's hoses took 20 minutes to extinguish the blaze, and the cruiser was badly damaged. Neither of the Waroo's two crew were injured and master of the Kanangra, Mr John Whetton, described the incident as a very lucky escape.
- June 1964, Leaving Circular Quay on an evening run with several hundred passengers, Kanangra collided with the 7,000 tonne Japanese freighter Awata Maru off Kirribilli. The ferry suffered significant damage and a passenger was cut by glass, however, it was still able to travel to Cremorne Wharf well all passengers were discharged.
- 30 August 1970 - 600 passengers were taken off Kanangra by Kosciusko after she went adrift and threatened to go aground following engine failure during a harbour cruise near Chinamans Beach.
- November 1984, she collided with the North Head off the Opera House.

== See also ==
- List of Sydney Harbour ferries
- Timeline of Sydney Harbour ferries
