= Knee (construction) =

Curved piece of wood

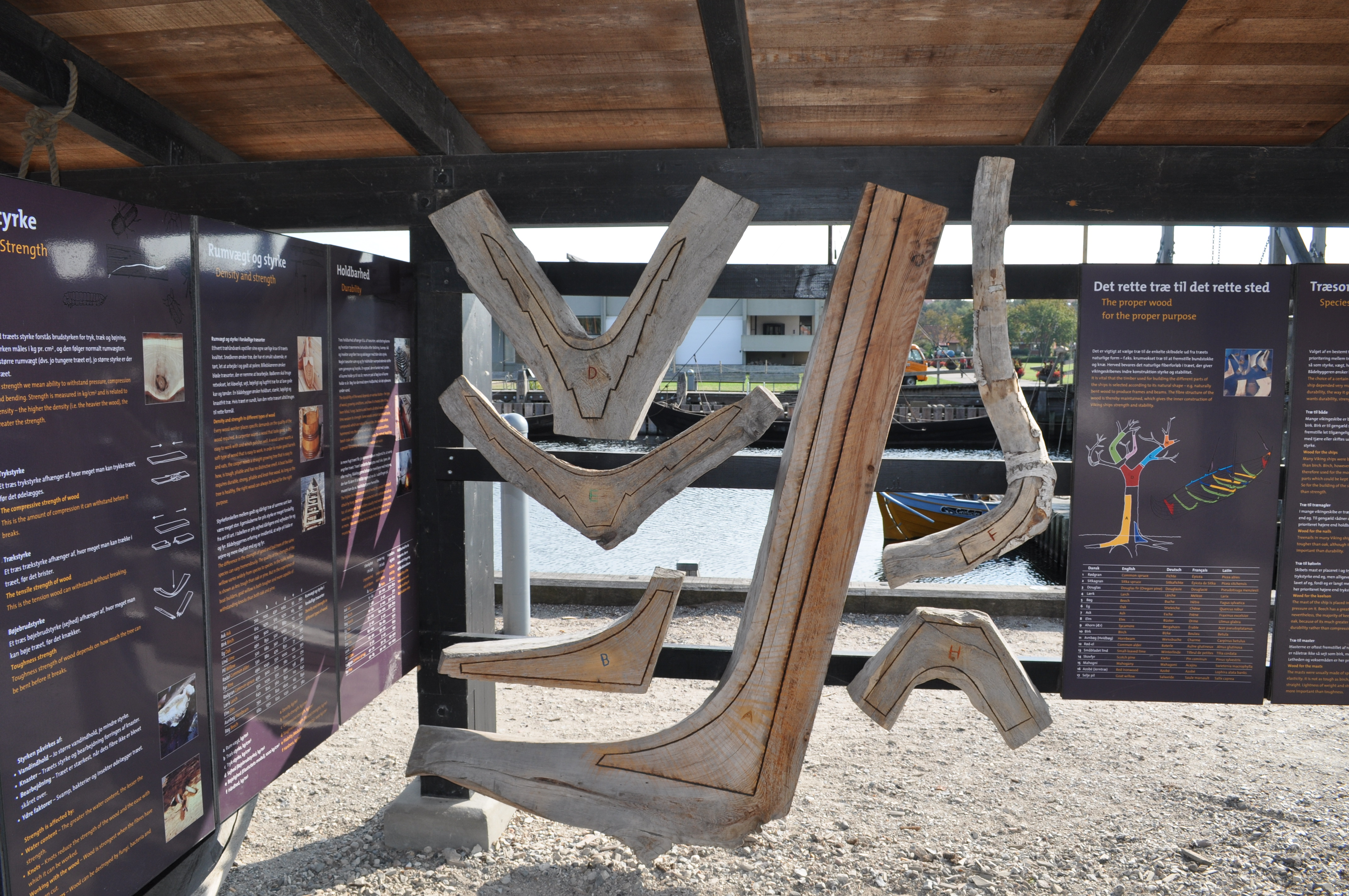
Knee timbers in boat building

In woodworking, a knee is a natural or cut curved piece of wood. Knees, sometimes called ship's knees, are a common form of bracing in boat building and occasionally in timber framing. A knee rafter in carpentry is a bent rafter used to gain head room in an attic.

== Strength characteristics ==
Wood is a highly anisotropic material (its strength varies considerably with the direction of applied force, i.e., parallel, radial, or tangential to the grain). Because wood is strongest when loaded in tension or compression along the grain, the best knees are those in which the wood grain follows the bend. For a knee with relatively little bend, it may be possible to cut the knee out of a single straight-grained board and still achieve sufficient strength. However, with increasing bend this method becomes problematic since more and more of the knee is aligned across the grain and is therefore considerably weaker. A knee laid out this way might easily snap in two under hand pressure alone, even if it is generously sized. In boat joinery constantly subject to shock and fatigue loading this method is unsuitable.

To avoid this issue knees requiring sharper curves are made using methods which ensure that the wood grain and direction of load are closely aligned. This can be achieved by steam bending, laminating, or selecting a natural crook with matching grain - a "grown knee". Grown knees are generally considered as the best method among boat builders and have a strong traditions associated with their use, but they may not achieve the same strength as a good laminated knee.

== Types ==
Bent - Bent knees are formed by plasticizing the wood to make it flexible via boiling, steaming, or microwaving (for small components). While still hot, the wood can be bent into a shape suitable for the location - either on a form or by forcing and securing it directly into the final service location. Steam-bending is a time-honored method for shaping boat frames, but it does weaken the wood slightly, it can leave residual stresses which may cause breakage or spring-back over time, and it is limited in the degree of bend which it can achieve, particularly for thick members. Also, not all species of wood steam bend well.

Laminated - Laminated knees are formed by coating thin, flexible strips of wood with adhesive, layering them to achieve the required thickness, then forcing the desired bend into the layup and securing it until the adhesive sets. Laminated knees are very strong and can be made in shapes which would be difficult to achieve using other methods, but they require time for the adhesive to cure, they are messier to construct, and they must use a jig or fixture to secure them until the adhesive cures.

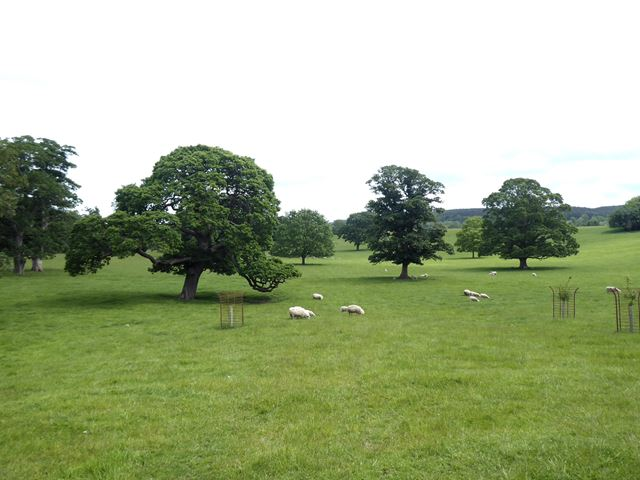
Traditional English parkland: short, springy turf with spaced trees. This landscape was once quite profitable. Sheep kept the greensward closely-cropped and provided valuable wool (see enclosure and Scottish Clearances), and parkland trees grew curved branches and provided grown knees valuable in shipbuilding.

Grown - The term "grown knees" refers to any knee which is made from a natural crook or bend in a tree. Grown knees can be taken from several locations within a tree. The roots are a particularly useful source as the root structure of many species of trees naturally spreads out laterally just beneath the ground in order to help anchor the tree. This provides a fairly reliable source of approximately 90 degree crooks which may be impossible to find in other portions of the tree. In order to obtain this raw material for knees builders may dig up a stump in its entirety, as unlike other portions of the tree, it is impossible to judge the quality and quantity of available material in the roots as they are underground. Once the stump has been dug up the knees can be sawn or split from suitable natural crooks. However, knees sawn from a stump can quickly dull tools used to shape and finish them - as the roots grow they envelop small particles of soil and rock, which acts as an embedded abrasive and accelerates the wear of edged tools. For species of wood with appropriate splitting characteristics, such as oak, the stump can be split into wedges, with one large root on each wedge; each wedge is then carved into a rib for a small boat. Historically, tree shaping was sometimes used to grow a tree into a marketable shape (coppicing and pollarding were used for small, straight timbers, like withies).

== Terminology ==
A sharp bend in a piece of wood is also called "cranked". Commonly used in shipbuilding known as ship's knees for their advantage of reducing the encroachment into the usable space of the structure since there is no spandrel. Also knee rafter increases the usable space in an attic by creating a kneewall-like space.

A ship's knee has two parts called the arm (shorter) and a body (longer). The outside surfaces come to a corner, (typically 90 degrees in buildings) called the heel. The inside surface retains its natural shape and the curve is called the bosom. The thickness between the heel and bosom is the throat. The ends of the arm and body are the toes.

The names of ship's knees are based on their position:

- Hanging knee, the arm is down;
- Standing knee, the arm is up;
- Lodging knee, the arm is sideways;
- Boson knee or lap knee, (unclear);
- Quarter knee, quarter sawn thus smaller but without the pith (center of the tree rings) so less prone to checking;
- Dagger knee, in shipbuilding, typically a hanging knee set slightly off diagonally to clear an obstruction such as a gunport in a fighting ship. From "Building the Wooden Fighting Ship" Dodds and Moore 1984

Knees can be blind pegged with foxtail wedges on both ends or bolted in place.

== Favored species of wood ==
Due to tradition, ease of workability, strength and durability characteristics, some species of wood are particularly prized for making knees. Tamarack (also known as hackmatack) stumps are among the preferred softwood species for grown knees, while white oak, live oak, and elm are preferred for hardwoods for bent knees due to their ease of steam bending.
