= Steering pole =

A steering pole is a light spar extending from the bow of a straight deck ship which aids the wheelsman in steering.

Ancient literature indicates that steering poles have long been part of boat construction, and are referred to in ancient texts such as the Epic of Gilgamesh.
