= Scottish Clearances =

The Scottish Clearances can refer to either:

- Lowland Clearances
- Highland Clearances
