= The Tatty Hollow Story =

1974 play by Dorothy Hewett

Bonbons and Roses for Dolly
- Written by: Dorothy Hewett
- Characters: Jo; Ben Trainor; Rod Travers; Johnny Apple; Rube Hannah; Robin Truelove; Paul Laureate; Tatty Hollow
- Genre: Expressionist
- Setting: Cyclorama

Premiere
- Date: 1976

The Tatty Hollow Story, Dorothy Hewett's fifth full-length play, and last of a series of expressionist plays, was written in 1974 after Hewett's move from Perth to Sydney.

Five men and a female psychiatrist gather after seeing graffiti saying "Tatty Hollow". Tatty is their former lover whom they had each presumed dead. While they argue with each other about Tatty, vignettes of their times with Tatty play out.

== Setting ==
A black glossy reflective curved wall (cyclorama) which reflects the actors.

- Far left: psychiatrist desk and chair, with radiogram and bar.
- Stage Centre: Telephone box, containing a dress dummy in a provocative outfit including boa and pearls, with its back to audience.
- Downstage far right: a heap of rubble and a bath.

== Characters ==
- Jo: a psychiatrist, powerful sexy and serene
- Ben Trainor: Rich left wing lawyer, Tatty's ex husband
- Rod Travers: zoologist and environmentalist
- Johnny Apple: boilermaker, uneducated schizophrenic bum
- Rube Hannah: Big and brutal, Tatty's first and last lover, owns a laundrette and strip clubs.
- Professor Robin Truelove: bearded academic, prominent in Labor politics
- Paul Laureate: student poet, homeless street singer, Tatty's student, early 20s
- Tatty Hollow: academic. Ageless luscious long-haired blonde, intelligent and romantic, victim and destroyer

== Synopsis ==
In keeping with other expressionist works, the play bends time and reality, with the characters talking at cross-purposes, scenes from different time periods playing simultaneously, and an array of repeated songs and musical motifs, which accelerate as the play progresses.

=== Act One ===
Three men enter in sequence to talk to a woman psychiatrist and each other. They all knew each other in the 1940s. They have heard conflicting stories of how Tatty Hollow has died, and are puzzled by graffiti. As they describe Tatty, they play through early scenes with her.

Ben sits with Jo, discussing Tatty somewhat at cross purposes. Tatty was Jo’s school friend, who was somewhat lower-rung socially. She died eating a ham sandwich. She didn’t like women.

Lights come up on Tatty in the bath, quasi-nude. She falls on the floor, with Ben across her. Ben is disappointed with his “first time”. Tatty is going to Melbourne, says goodbye to Ben and she is so fond of him. Jo says Ben hates Tatty and slaps Ben's face.

Rod enters. He and Ben talk about their wives, who hate Tatty. Rod asked Jo to marry him, on the rebound from Tatty. He says Tatty is a former Miss World, and she slashed her wrists after Paul was killed in the Johannesburg Grand Prix. Tatty speaks of living like Garbo and never marrying. Rod has been seeing ghosts of Tatty in the zoo. She ran away with Paul, who was her student and a street poet. Rod and Ben both think Paul is their son with Tatty. Rod hooked up with Tatty when she returned from London, but couldn’t "get it up". Tatty says they’ve all achieved nothing, she wouldn’t want to know any of them. Tatty leaves and Jo says she was magnificent,

Johnny Apple enters. He says Tatty is homeless now in Kings Cross. He had read she jumped off the Three Sisters with Paulie in her arms. She was a queen bee woman and they were all her drones.

Ben and Johnny have a fist fight when Ben comes home unexpectedly and catches him with Tatty. Tatty leaves Ben who keeps Paulie. Johnny and Tatty have a child Paulie too. They go to Russia and China. Johnny thinks Tatty is a triple agent and is poisoning him with China tea.

Johnny thinks Tatty is now haunting them all. He says they will hold a dinner party with all Tatty’s lovers present to flush her out. Rube and Robin will need to be included.

=== Act Two ===
Jo, Ben, Rod and Rube are in Jo's apartment. Jo and Rube discuss how she and Tatty were sharing a flat at University in 1942. Rube had been Tatty's first lover but he and Jo were attracted. They play through a love triangle scene with Tatty.

Robin arrives, flirts with Jo, and jeers at Rube's porn business. Ben admires Robin as a creative academic, until Robin says he "got off" with Tatty in the world’s capitals. Conference meetings of Tatty and Robin in Berlin are played out, where Robin is world-weary and Tatty a sophisticate.

Paul Laureate enters in a top hat, dancing, singing and throwing toilet paper. He tries to pick up Tatty, saying she is still beautiful. They will sell poems in the streets. Robin says Paul is his son.

Tatty becomes a drag hit in Rube’s joint, surrounded by her five male lovers. The five men circle Tatty. She can remember moments of intimacy with them all. She asks why did they and so many others think they had to defend themselves against her? Johnny takes the dummy out of the booth and cradles it, but the other men strip it bare, giving the wig to Jo. Jo cradles the dummy, saying she and Tatty lay in each others arms and joked about Tatty's men after they had gone. She says that Tatty never cared for any of them.

Almost at the end, Tatty crawls out of the rubble as a street person with a large paintbrush, and pokes Paul who is asleep in the bath. Paul and Tatty sing their theme lines. Jo clasps the effigy, Paul sleeps under his hat, and Tatty mixes paint and sings.

== Performances ==
The play was commissioned by the Department of English at the University of Sydney. It has only been staged five times, although it is "one of Hewett's favourites". There have been two readings using professional actors.

- 1974 Sydney University Women's College (staged reading)
- 1976 Stables Theatre, directed by Alexander Hay
- 1979 Guild Theatre, Melbourne University. directed by Kate Legge
- 1995 Belvoir Theatre Surry Hills (reading) directed by Rodney Fisher
- 2011 NIDA, directed by Kevin Jackson

The reading staged in August 1974 was Hewett’s first foray into the world of Sydney theatre after her move from Perth. It involved very well known actors, including Jennifer Claire as Tatty, Janet Kingsbury as Jo and John Gaden as Ben. The music for two of the songs was by Hewett’s daughter Kate Lilley, who was only 13 at the time.

In 1975 the writers Bob Ellis and Anne Brooksbank bought the Nimrod Theatre Building in Darlinghurst and renamed it “The Stables”. It has always been difficult to mount professional productions of Australian plays without support, and the couple sought an International Women’s Year Grant to stage the play. Funding was delayed, so the production was not mounted till 1976. It starred Pat Bishop as Tatty, Barry Otto as Ben, Robin Bowering as Rod, Mervyn Drake as Johnny, and John Orcsic as Rube.

Pat Bishop actually appeared nude on stage during the bath scene. She told Hewett she felt uncomfortable every time she had to do this. Hewett famously replied that if she looked like Bishop she would never wear any clothes.

The 1979 Melbourne Union production considered the play is about “one woman shaped by six men” rather than “five men and a woman confused by images of one woman”. It used “seven Tattys performing the function of a Greek chorus to comment on and interpret the dramatic action.”

== Quotations ==
- It’s raining in Sydney, like it’s raining in my heart.
- You couldn’t kill ‘er with an axe. Women are magical, they renew themselves.
- Would you rather fuck or masturbate?
- How long do I have to suffer these cuntless bastards?
- All you’ve got is a name, and that’s a mockery.

== Themes ==
As was mostly the case with Hewett's work in the 1970s, her characters are based loosely on real people. The first three of these (Lloyd Davies, Ron Strahan, Les Flood) are in her autobiography Wild Card. Robin is historian Ian Turner. Jo is loosely based on Hewett's sister Lesley. Rube appears to be fictional. Some of the incidents described in the play are imaginary.

Tatty is a glamorised queen bee with fascinated drones who between them are unable to define her. They also cannot agree on simple facts, such as how or if she died, who Paulie is, or whether Jo is a sister, a bridesmaid or a roommate.

To some extent the play is an extended joke. The men are fascinated by a glamorous character from their past, but she turns out to be a homeless bag lady. Men are easily misled by their pursuit of glamour, and the only way Tatty can be free of their yearnings is to roam the streets as an old woman freed of her own sexuality.

Some feminist critics have disliked the deliberate element of “male gaze” in the play, believing that Tatty is "defined by men" rather than the reverse.

A case can be made that Tatty is actually a metaphor for Sydney, a city both glamorous and tatty, a world city but one whose myths have been created by homeless people.

== Controversy ==
Hewett's first husband Lloyd Davies claimed to recognise himself in The Tatty Hollow Story and in The Chapel Perilous. As part of his 1977 libel suit against Hewett, he obtained a legal settlement that these two plays would not be performed in Western Australia. Copies of the respective books by Currency Press have a sticker, “Warning. Not for Sale in Western Australia”.

Les Flood “Johnny Apple” came across the script and wrote a parody called “Toody Waits” where the cast is taken away by aliens at the end. He convinced a theatrical group to stage it, but they withdrew when someone discovered the links to The Tatty Hollow Story.

== Resources ==
Dorothy Hewett (1976). Bon-bons and roses for Dolly; The Tatty Hollow story: two plays. Currency Press.
