= Bonbons and Roses for Dolly =

1972 play by Dorothy Hewett

- Written by: Dorothy Hewett
- Characters: Dolly Garden; Ned Corker; Mary Corker; Jack Garden; Maddy Garden; Mr Ortabee; Ollie Pullitt; The Boyfriend; The Builder
- Genre: Expressionist
- Setting: Cinema foyer

Premiere
- Date: 1972

Bonbons and Roses for Dolly, Dorothy Hewett's fourth full-length play, was written in 1971, soon after The Chapel Perilous. It begins with the rise to riches of three generations of a family, and the opening of their new picture house, the Crystal Palace. Over the years the cinema descends into ruin. The daughter Dolly inherits the decaying theatre. She symbolically shoots her grandparents and parents, then herself, as her dreams crumble.

== Setting ==
Foyer of a 1938 Art Deco movie house, the Crystal Palace. A central flight of stairs leads up to a perspex mirror-curtain/ projection screen, which acts as a gateway to the wider present and to the past. Blow-up portraits of movie stars of the 1930s and '40s are prominent.

In Act One the theatre is in the process of construction. At completion a neon sign flares out "Crystal Palace".

In Act Two the foyer is shabby, diminished and lit by one dim bulb. All is in decay. The sign says "Cry Palace".

At the start of Act 3 the stage is dark except for a lit central love-seat, a projection screen that is lowered from the flies, and Ortabee sitting at the organ.

== Characters ==
- Mary Cracknell/Corker: little and pitiless, keeps the till
- Ned Corker: her husband, the Silver Fox, a "thirty bob toff"
- Jack Garden: The Black Prince, forever 35
- Maddy Corker/Garden: thirtyish, pretty dreamer
- Dolly Garden: the '30s girl, aged from 16 to 40
- Mr Ortabee, the manager: Liberace on the Wurlitzer
- Ollie Pullitt, an Old Friend of Maddy: menopausal in a hat
- The Worker: builds the Palace
- The Boyfriend: dangerous and sweet

=== Five Dummies ===
- The Twinnies, chrome in masks, ticket takers
- Mrs Ought-to-Be Ortabee: Ortabee's de facto
- Mate: a soft dummy, Ollie's husband
- The fireman

== Synopsis ==
In keeping with other expressionist works, the play's dialogue is rapidly, almost inconsequentially, exchanged between characters. The text is interwoven with songs, recorded music, extravagant lighting effects, and media projections.

=== Act I 1930s ===
Ortabee and the Wurlitzer cinema organ rise from the pit as he plays "Tiptoe through the tulips" against projected images of brownshirt Nazis and of Dolly glamorously descending the staircase, Ziegfeld Follies style. Ortabee sings the "Bonbons and roses for Dolly" theme. The Builder recites bills of quantities while Mary describes how to perfume gloves, and how she became a society dressmaker and met handsome and unreliable Ned Corker, She finds nits in Maddie's long golden curls and has her head shaved. The family move to Western Australia and Mary makes the family fortune. Ned gives up alcohol. Maddy meets Jack, who has returned from the War, and they marry. Ned sings "Old Henry Parkes".The cast talk of memory and wickedness in the bush.

The Worker completes the cinema in 1938. A neon sign "Crystal Palace" lights up. The cast drag in the dummies for a celebration, while lights whirl. Ollie Pullitt has complementary tickets for the first performance. All sing the Bonbons theme, finishing with "All for you" repeated as Dolly sweeps down the stairs, a perfect '30s girl in pale green crepe-de-chine.

=== Act II 1960s ===
Ortabee and the Wurlitzer are tatty and aging. Ortabee tap dances and tells the dummies they were all a great team in the theatre's heyday. He says he "got five years for fumbling little boys in the back stalls". The neon sign now reads "Cry Palace".

Dolly has inherited the cinema, and she makes a surprise visit, dowdy and middle-aged. Ortabee sings, "I'd know you anywhere". Dolly knocks a hole in the mirror and walks through. The scene fires up into streamers and action as the decrepit theatre revives. Jack and Ned offer Dolly bonbons and roses. Dolly is waiting for the Boyfriend, who is late. Nazi images are on the screen. Dolly does a semi-strip while singing "Listen darling". She waves her hand like a wand, and the theatre shimmers and fires up a further level. An enormous portrait of a glamorised Dolly descends from the roof. Ortabee, wearing a Liberace coat, and the cast greet Dolly the musical star, sex symbol of a nation. All sing, "You're so marvelous." The Boyfriend arrives, and sings "Sensational Story". Dolly pulls out a pearl-handled revolver and shoots him—and then shoots Ned, Mary, Maddy and Jack. Dolly asks for more bonbons and roses and shoots herself. The lights dim. Ortabee talks about dreams, visions and glamour, then loneliness.

=== Act III 1972 ===
Scenes and dialogue relate to "The Bomb". Ortabee sings "Violence is as American as cherry pie". Ollie drags in the Mate dummy, sits on the Love Seat, and delivers an outrageous and hilarious monologue in Edna Everage style, proceeding through a Keep Australia White rant, her home abortions in the fridge, the Royal Family and the Fondas, and how she likes a man to be a man. The Corkers and Gardens appear in ghostly light as Ollie discusses them. Mary, Ned, Maddy and Jack express disconnected events in their lives and talk of their graves. They all sing "We're only shadows in a picture show" and leave. Ollie returns and sings "Karakatta Blues" with Ortabee. With the movie show over, Ollie shakes the Mate dummy to wake him and has a menstrual flooding. Ortabee pulls Ollie down and tickles her fancy until she orgasms. The cast all re-enter and sing the "Bonbons" theme: "We made it and we created it all for you".

== Performances ==
- 1972 The Playhouse, Perth. The National Theatre Company, directed by Ray Omodei music by John Williamson
- 1973 Jane St Theatre Sydney, directed by Alexander Hay, music by Mervyn Drake
- 1977 Drama Department, University of Newcastle, directed by Robert Page
- 1980 Heidelberg Theatre Company, directed by Ian Brown
- 1988 Eltham Little Theatre

== Music ==
The music consists of recordings and original songs covering three time periods: Music Hall for Act 1, '60s music in Act 2 and '70s music in Act 3.

The original music from each staging was not published and so had to be re-composed for subsequent performances. The Jane Street compositions by Mervyn Drake included some of Hewett's most memorable songs, including "Bonbons and Roses for Dolly", "Old Henry Parkes" and several others. The Playhouse performance has been recorded.

== Themes ==
The Corker and Garden characters are shades of Hewett's grandparents and parents, and the setting is an idealised version of their cinema the Regal Theatre. The family are from Hewett's 1966 epic poem "Legend of the Green Country", and were later described in considerably more detail in Hewett's autobiography Wild Card. Dolly Garden is a personification of Hewett's childhood longings for Hollywood, while Sally Banner in The Chapel Perilous personified her desire for a literary career.

In Act I, Ned and Mary, echoed by Maddie and Jack, establish a pattern of youthful hopes and dreams succeeded by disgust and lovelessness. In Act II, a despairing Dolly, with all her dreams lost, shoots the phantasms of her family, then herself. Ollie Pullit emerges in Act III, "a monster of nightmarish crudity and vulgarity", in what is the most powerful development in the play.

Arthur Ballet states. "A portrait is presented of life and death, encapsulated in a moving picture house. A strange dreamlike memory of a wondrous world which never existed is contrasted with the suburban, middle-aged Ollie's final, agonising hilarious monologue ... Ollie, a minor character (a member of the audience in fact) becomes the driving force and living factor of the play, the theatre house and the world stage...Little is sacred and everything is."

The play as written presents considerable challenges for set design and lighting.

== Reception and criticism ==
The initial performance in Perth in 1972 was terminated four days early after vandalism at the theatre. The audience were sharply divided; people either regarded it as an obscenity and walked out, or recognised it as a poetic drama of some complexity and saw it several times. In a 1972 unpublished letter, Hewett thought the play was "by far the best thing I have done" while describing the public hostility as violent, pathological and heartbreaking. Reactions included pornographic letters to the theatre, destruction of posters, the photographs in the foyer tom up and shoved down the toilet, and cancellations of season tickets.

The negative audience reaction seems to have been partly the result of confusing publicity. "Far from being a nostalgic trip into local history with overtones of contemporary relevance, it was an expressionist mosaic of time, past and time present, rendered in poetic shorthand and punctuated with songs." There were elements of sexual chauvinism in the negative response, in that the "blue" elements consisted of "women's business" – abortion, menstrual flooding and female orgasm. The predominantly middle-class suburban audience was confused by the explosive expressionism of the action. There was considerable uncertainty as to what was real and what was imaginary (for example, it is not clear in Act II if Dolly actually becomes a star or whether this is a dream). Act III is a powerful tour-de-force separated in style from the rest of the play, which Margot Luke believes is "diffracting and diffusing of understanding rather than aiding it."

The second production in Sydney in 1973 starred Wendy Blacklock as Dolly, Maggie Dence as Ollie, Max Phipps as Ned, Babs McMillan as Mary, and Mervyn Drake as Ortabee. The play was very well received and the season was extended.

However, Harry Kippax, the drama critic of the Sydney Morning Herald, who was mostly hostile to Hewett's work, got up and left the theatre during the "flooding" scene and gave the play a withering review. “A lollipop of hopeful entertainment … dress this unarticulated skeleton of a piece in pseudo-poetry, garnish heavily with symbolism and self-pity… In even the lightest trifle in the theatre, making-it-up-as-you go is no substitute for a beginning, a middle and an end.” According to the director Aubrey Mellor, Kippax subsequently led a "real vendetta" against Hewett.

== Awards ==
The script shared an AWGIE Award for Stage in 1974.

== Resources ==
Dorothy Hewett (1976). Bon-bons and roses for Dolly; The Tatty Hollow story: two plays. Currency Press.

Margot Luke (1972). Insight and outrage: Dorothy Hewett's new play. Westerly 4: 37-40
