= The Rising of Pete Marsh =

Play written by Dorothy Hewett

- Original language: English
- Written by: Dorothy Hewett
- Genre: drama

Premiere
- Date: 29 January 1988
- Place: Perth

The Rising of Pete Marsh is a play by Australian playwright Dorothy Hewett. Music was composed by Jim Cotter.

The central character is an almost perfectly preserved body found in peat marshes in England in 1984, known as Lindow Man or Pete Marsh. The first Act relates his story during the Roman occupation of Britain. In the second Act the body is discovered and revived to live briefly in the year 2000.The characters of the first Act reappear as contemporary figures.

The play explores the age old human yearning for immortality, whether by Celtic reincarnation, the Christian belief in the immortality of the soul or the scientist's tinkering with genetic engineering. It contrasts the Nature Religion of the Forest People with the God of Love who forbids natural relations between men and women.

== Premiere ==
The play was commissioned by the Department of English at the University of Western Australia, and Hewett travelled to Perth for six months in 1987 to oversee the production. It premiered in the New Fortune Theatre for the Festival of Perth. It was directed by Aarne Neeme, bringing the director back to the stage of Hewett's most famous play, The Chapel Perilous.
