= Joan (rock opera) =

1975 rock opera by Dorothy Hewett

Joan: Trial and true story of Joan L. Ark
- Written by: Dorothy Hewett
- Characters: Joan the peasant, Joan the soldier, Joan the saint, Joan the witch, Charlie Dauphin
- Subject: Effect of authority on the inspired
- Genre: Rock opera
- Setting: Lunacy court of the psychiatric ward at Rouen

Premiere
- Date premiered: 27 August 1975
- Place premiered: Canberra Repertory Theatre

A 1975 rock opera by Dorothy Hewett describing the rise of a peasant girl, her betrayal, execution and ultimate canonisation.

== Setting ==
The lunacy court of the psychiatric ward at Rouen (formerly known as Rheims Cathedral). A large empty structure: part abandoned church, part mediaeval asylum. Backstage are four revolving glass panels representing stained glass windows. On one side they contain four effigies, on the reverse side the four real Joan figures may stand.

== Characters ==
- Joan Lark (1): The peasant visionary
- Joan the soldier (2): Militant, masculine strong minded
- Joan the witch (3): sometimes demented, sometimes intellectual
- Joan the saint (4): An unreal and holy icon
- Charlie Dauphin: A half-witted peasant boy
- Hospital staff: Authority figures with masks
- Incidental characters: parents, Lady, priest, two soldiers

The crowd: peasants, soldiers, nuns, priests, nurses, psychiatrists and the insane

== Synopsis ==
The play is a pageant or chronicle play, with complex, frenzied interaction between the four Joans and other characters. It uses some of the same staging devices and covers some of the same themes as Hewett's The Chapel Perilous; when the independent and disruptive woman is put on trial.

ACT I: Charlie the dauphin is putting together four dismembered dolls of the four Joans. Joan the Mad is examined in a trial by staff of a mental hospital, and relates her past. Joan Lark the peasant girl is told by her "voices", the other three Joans to take the simpleton Charlie to Reims to crown him king and free the people. The soldiers truss up Charlie and Joan frees him. They escape to the forest – she is dressed as a man, Charlie as a girl. It is cold and she lies with Charlie.

ACT II. The Joans are killed one by one. Soldier Joan (2) brings a horse and sword and Joan (1) dies in a carnival musician's box. Joan (2) takes Orleans and is hit by an arrow. Joan (3) crowns Charles at Reims but he does not recognise her and betrays her. Joan sleeps with a soldier and repudiates her voices rather than be imprisoned for life. Joan (3) is pronounced insane and killed by electronic shock therapy. Saint Joan (4) emerges canonised.

== Music ==
The music was composed by conductor and composer Patrick Flynn. The orchestration is liturgical in style and makes extensive use of tubular bells. The 13 songs include “Poor brother king”, “I’m a witch I’m a bitch” and the repeated motif “We love you Joan”.

== Premiere and reception ==
The only production was at Canberra Theatre, August 27 1975, directed by Ross McGregor for Canberra Repertory Theatre.

Ken Healey described the production as “a frenzy of sound and spectacle” employing a “skilful juxtaposition of opposites; sacred and profane, past and present, virgin and whore, judiciary and asylum”, with Joan presenting a “kaleidoscopically shattered personality”. He particularly commended Jude Kuring’s performance as Joan the Witch as “monumental in towering menace”.

== Publication ==
Joan, by Dorothy Hewett, music by Patrick Flynn. Yackandandah Playscripts. Montmorency Vic, 1984.
