= Pandora's Cross =

1978 rock musical by Dorothy Hewett

Pandora’s Cross
- Written by: Dorothy Hewett
- Characters: The Goose, Pandora, Mac Greene, Frangipanni Waterfall, Sergeant Tinkerbell, Primavera, Rudi, Ethel Malley, Ern Malley
- Subject: Redevelopment
- Genre: Rock musical
- Setting: Kings Cross, Sydney

Premiere
- Date premiered: 29 June 1978
- Place premiered: Paris Theatre, Sydney

Pandora's Cross is a rock musical by Dorothy Hewett with original music by Ralph Tyrrell, set in Sydney's red light district King's Cross, and incorporating various mythical characters or characters loosely based on colourful identities.

== Synopsis ==
The play is an atmospheric, expressionist musical and a nostalgic celebration rather than a sustained drama.

The action centres on a motley collection of the area's residents who are trying to prevent their homes being destroyed by progress. Their attempts to revive the "Old Cross" through a Village Festival come to nothing. The stripper Primavera, who "knows too much" is murdered offstage. The residents are dispersed across the "wasteland" of the western suburbs of Sydney. However the 'Cross lives on in the imaginative life of the residents.

== Setting ==
The set is divided into upstairs and downstairs sections, with an elevated platform for the Goose's honky-tonk piano. The backdrop is a panoramic, moveable King's Cross skyline that lights up at night.

Upstairs: Pan's loft

- cushions, a sword, two large candlesticks, drapes, masks, strange paintings.
- Ethel Malley's room containing a straight-backed kitchen chair and an Early Kooka gas stove... The Goose's piano and stool on a platform.

Downstairs: There is a staircase which can convert to an escalator. This leads into the Village

- a streetlight far left, a fountain playing, a sycamore tree backstage left of centre, and Prim's bar, neon lit with bar and stools.
- Centre is Mac's room, a cheap table, chairs, battered typewriter, reading lamp and booze.

The stage direction begins, "the scene opens on the night skyline of the Cross. High in the flies Sydney is falling, the developers are in and the sound of demolition is deafening. Suspended in blackness like an actor in the Prague Black Theatre the ancient Goose in verdigris coat-tails sits at his honky-tonk piano. As he sings, the panorama of the Cross unrolls behind him, faster and faster, so that by an optical illusion he appears to be a whirling maestro of the sky signs. Up and down the moving staircase the characters enter and move like ghosts, like waxwork figures."

== Characters ==
- Pandora (Pan) - King's Cross witch and artist, black-haired, sensual, in her forties.
- Mac Greene - ex-poet, classical scholar, alcoholic bum in his late thirties.
- Ern Malley - Romantic poet, forever twenty-five.
- Ethel Malley - Ern's sister, withdrawn eccentric, in her late thirties.
- Frangipanni Waterfall (Fran) - Prostitute, a teenager from Blacktown on mandies.
- Primavera (Prim) - Ex-stripper and club proprietor, a well-proportioned blonde in her late thirties.
- The Goose - Ancient ex-Philharmonic conductor, jazz pianist, porn pedlar, Grand Master of the coven.
- Rudi - The Cross cowboy working for Mr Big.
- Sergeant Tinkerbell (Tink) - Still handsome policeman and drag queen.

The characters are misfits, but all except Ern are relative innocents in an encroaching world of development.

== Themes ==
The play is Hewett's paean to the city of Sydney and to Kings Cross, "Sydney's notorious square mile at the top of William Street" - the edgy red light district she lived in or near for 20 years. It concerns the threat to what is valuable in Australia by the destructive march of progress, and the place of the artist in creating and preserving the essential Australia.

== Premiere ==
The play was directed by Jim Sharman – already famous for his productions of Hair, Jesus Christ Superstar and The Rocky Horror Show - featuring a stellar cast of some of Sydney's top theatre performers. Original music was composed by Ralph Tyrrell, with sets by Brian Thomson and costumes by Luciana Arrighi. The cast included John Gaden, Jennifer Claire, Robyn Nevin, Neil Redfern, Geraldine Turner, Steve J. Spears and Arthur Dignam.

To support the new theatre, the cast agreed to forgo salary during rehearsals. The set was very ambitious and very expensive for the time - Arthur Dignam said, "we pretended to be a very rich theatre when we were a very poor theatre."

While the general impression was that the season was short and the box office takings were inadequate, in fact the play ran through the whole of July, the longest season for any Hewett play, and takings considerably exceeded that of the following Louis Nowra play. After the Paris Theatre season concluded, the production was carried to the Sydney Opera House but closed after one week because of audience hostility.

== The Paris Company ==
The Paris Company was formed in March 1978, supported by leading members of the Sydney theatre scene, including author and playwright Patrick White. It aimed to take up the mantle of the fading Old Tote Theatre company. However, the company folded after two productions - Pandora's Cross, and Visions by Louis Nowra.

The original building was designed by Walter Burley Griffin and opened as the Australian Picture Palace in 1916. It was renamed the Paris Theatre in 1954 and was thereafter operated by the Hoyts group until 1977. It was the site of an International Women's Day Protest in March 1978, and in late May, just prior to Pandora's Cross, it hosted Sydney's first Gay and Lesbian movie festival.

Artist Martin Sharp produced three posters for events at the Paris theatre between 1978 and 1980. These promoted the 1978 productions of Pandora's Cross and Visions, plus the independent With a Little Help from my Friends (John Lennon) in 1980. The Pandora's Cross poster features a voluptuous, naked female figure in yellow and red surrounded by a heart-shaped cascade of musical notes.

== Reception ==
Critical reception was divided.

Bob Ellis described the play as "a tender uproarious nocturne to a King's Cross forever dying and forever reborn", giving the "myth-starved metropolis" at long last an urban mythology. He lauded Hewett as "La Hewett, who is in no way inferior to Shakespeare in her breadth of vision, her verbal facility and her insights into character", urging audiences to "beat a path through broken bottles to its door". Candida Baker saw the performance and was "knocked out by it. The play was so lively and raucous, and so much more alive than the theatre in England at that time."

Some critics were still unable to come to terms with expressionist theatre, with its "unabashed theatricality", lacking the conventional signals of plot and character development. The Sydney Morning Herald critic Harry Kippax referred to the play as "dramatically inert" and disliked the script, but actually enjoyed the performance and went to see it twice, saying, "Everyone In the show has a stunning scene." Ken Healy described it as "a performance which is only a tiny fraction of the sum of its considerable parts". Jill Neville thought the modest strip scene was "anti-feminist". The Jewish Times described Hewett as, "Australia's most overrated playwright."

The negative reaction extended to the audience. A puzzled Hewett explained, "they hated it...they hissed as I went past."

The public impression was that the play had "destroyed the Paris venture" while being shown on its home ground with a top cast and after high expectations had been established. It has never been performed again.

== Publication ==
The script was published in two acts in 1978 in Theatre Australia, and also in Hungary in 1979.
