= Me and the Man in the Moon =

Play written by Dorothy Hewett

Me and The Man in the Moon
- Original language: English
- Written by: Dorothy Hewett
- Genre: Musical theatre

Premiere
- Date: 9 October 1987
- Place: Wagga NSW
- Directed by: Ray Goodlass

Me and the Man in the Moon is a 1987 play by Australian playwright Dorothy Hewett, with music by Robert Page. It recreates the days of the travelling tent show which took melodrama and variety theatre to country audiences from 1910 to the 1950s. One of these travelling variety shows also appears in Hewett's hit play The Man from Mukinupin.

The play follows Joe Samedi, the son of a Jamaican wire walker, who loves his tent, and his wife Gracie, who finds the travelling life vulgar. It is set mainly in Queensland. The characters are "cardboard cutouts" and are only props for the musical numbers. The romantic goings-on between the Samedi family and the performers take placer against world events that are only lightly developed. It is a light-hearted and unpretentious evocation of a largely forgotten part of Australia's theatrical history.

The play premiered at the Riverina Playhouse in Wagga from October 9 to 24, 1987.

== Review ==
Ann Nugent, Canberra Times 13 October 1987.
