= Paris Theatre, Sydney =

Cinema and theatre in Sydney, Australia

Paris Theatre
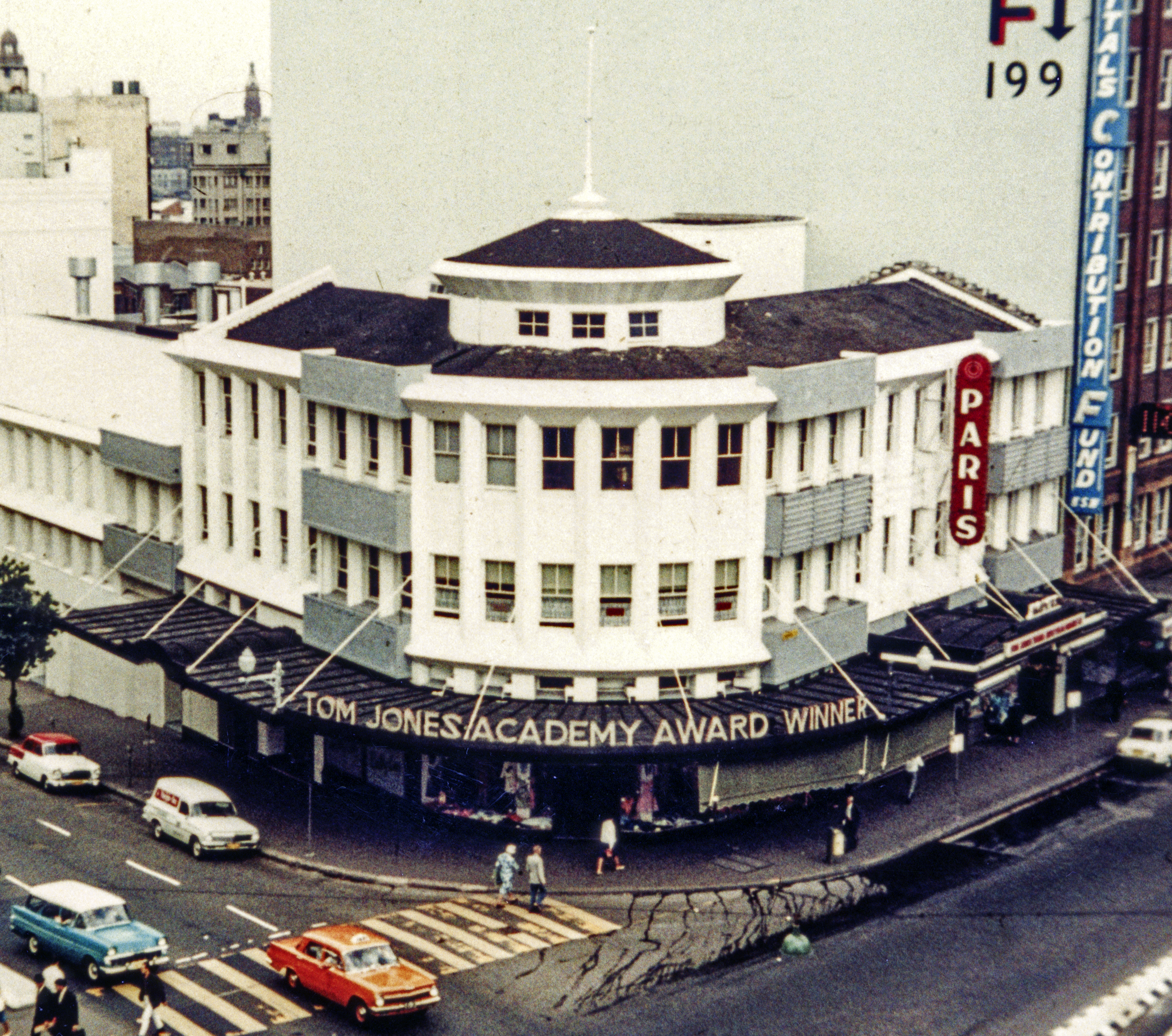
- Paris Theatre, 1965
- Interactive map of Paris Theatre
- Former names: Australian Picture Palace, Tatler Theatre, Park Theatre
- Address: 205-207 Liverpool Street, Sydney on the corner of Wentworth Avenue; Sydney; Australia
- Coordinates: 33.8769681°S 151.2119533°E
- Designation: Demolished
- Current use: Site occupied by apartments

Construction
- Opened: 1916
- Closed: 1981
- Architects: Walter Burley Griffin, Burcham Clamp, C. Bruce Dellit

The Paris Theatre was a cinema and theatre located on the corner of Wentworth Avenue and Liverpool Street in Sydney that was a venue for movies, vaudeville, cabaret and plays. The theatre changed names several times, beginning as the Australia Picture Palace (1915-1935), and later the Tatler Theatre (1935-1950), Park Theatre (1952-1954) and Paris Theatre, (1954-1981) before being demolished in 1981.

In May 1978, the theatre hosted a film festival that inspired the first Sydney Gay Mardi Gras. The theatre was also the home of the Sydney-based Paris Theatre Company, a Sydney based theatre company.

== Building ==
Located at 205-207 Liverpool Street, on the corner of Wentworth Avenue, the architect was Walter Burley Griffin The theatre was a reinforced concrete building with relief stucco paneling. It was demolished in 1981.

== History ==
=== Australian Picture Palace (1915-1935) ===
The Australia Picture Palace, designed by Walter Burley Griffin, was built in 1915 for Hoyt’s Theatres Ltd and opened on 7 January 1916.

=== Tatler Theatre (1935-1950) ===
In 1935, the venue was renovated and renamed the Tatler Theatre. On 5 August 1943, Austral American Productions began showing first-run Warner Brothers films in an exclusive arrangement. The first movie to be screened was “They Died with their Boots On” featuring Errol Flynn.

=== Park Theatre (1952-1954) ===
In 1952, Hoyts purchased the theatre and renamed it the Park Theatre.

=== Paris Theatre (1954-1981) ===
After being renovated again in 1954, the venue was renamed the Paris Theatre, and was dedicated to showing "continental" films. Coffee was to be served to patrons during intervals .

From 21–27 May 1978, 900 people attended Sydney's first gay film festival at the Paris Theatre. One of the films, Word is Out, inspired Ron Austin, a member of CAMP, with the idea of a street party, which became the first Mardi Gras in June of that year.

Some notable performances at the theatre included

- 20 November 1977 Rose Tattoo
- 27 November 1977 Cold Chisel
- August 1978 Louis Nowra play, Visions, opened.
- 28 November 1979 Boys Own MacBeth
- 20 December 1980 INXS

==== Paris Theatre Company ====
The Paris Company (formally the Paris Theatre Performance Group Limited), formed in March 1978 by Jim Sharman and Rex Cramphorn, staged two new Australian plays at the theatre: Dorothy Hewett's musical play Pandora's Cross, which opened in June 1978, and Louis Nowra's Visions, which opened in August 1978.
