= Golden Valley (children's play) =

1981 children's play by Dorothy Hewett

- Written by: Dorothy Hewett
- Characters: Aunt Jane (the crane); Aunt Em (the wombat); Uncle Nee (the possum); Uncle Di (the mopoke); Marigold; Jack Swannell; Nim; Tib the feral cat
- Genre: Children's theatre

Premiere
- Date premiered: 1981

Golden Valley is a children's play by Dorothy Hewett for audiences aged 4-14, It is "a free-spirited and distinctly Australian fairytale ", telling the story of a 12-year-old orphan Marigold, who is adopted by a group of bush creatures. They take her to the magical land of Golden Valley, which is under threat from a nasty developer. Together Marigold and the creatures -- including a crane, a mopoke, a possum, a wombat, a feral cat and a shape-changing boy -- battle to save their patch of paradise.

== Characters ==
Aunt Jane (the crane): tall gaunt and middle-aged

Aunt Em (the wombat): plump, elderly, motherly and short sighted

Uncle Nee (the possum): short furry faced red-headed middle aged and lame

Uncle Di (the mopoke): elderly, myopic, with a long straggly beard and glasses

- Mining Warden: in shortsleeves and green eyeshade

Marigold: a red-headed 12 year old orphan

Jack Swannell: a villainous landlord/ developer, wearing bifocals

Tib: the feral cat. A beautiful red-headed witch

- Mother superior: a nun with an Irish accent

Nim: a green ragged boy

- Yarriman: a part aboriginal stockman

- The Wishing Tree: a magic tree

- Joe Anchor: the ghost of a long dead miner

== Synopsis ==
This tale of protecting nature, the power of imagination and the evils of usury is loaded with special lighting effects, music and dance.

=== Act I ===
The four old people, Jane, Em, Nee and Di, sleep out in the open on iron beds with mosquito netting. As they sleep they leap out of bed with giant animal alter-egos projected behind them and dance wildly. As the sun rises they return to bed. They discuss how they need a child. Jane goes to the orphanage and returns with Marigold, who loves Golden Valley. Marigold finds the ragged green lost boy Nim, with his owl and falcon. Jack Swannell arrives threatening to take over the farm, and is chased offstage by Di.

They go to bed with many strange ghostly noises. Marigold hears a trapped animal and frees the red feral cat Tib. In the morning Tib turns into a witch and they fly on her broom.

=== Act II ===
Later that night, Tib and Marigold go around the bushland creatures, asking how to save Golden Valley. They eventually reach Joe Anchor who tells them to pan for gold in Mopoke Creek. They find a nugget. Jack Swannel offers to swap the mortgage for the gold claim. In town, the Mining Warden tells them it is Fool’s Gold. Marigold follows the track through the swamp to Jack’s, where he has imprisoned Nim’s birds. He says he’ll tear up the mortgage if Marigold will stay and cook for him. Yarriman arrives on a wooden horse to save the day. Jack falls down the well – and sacks of gold and another mysterious skeleton is found.

=== Epilogue ===
Nim’s shape-changing secrets are revealed. He tells Marigold “You can be whatever you want to be”.

== Performances ==
Public performances are shown in the Ausstage database.

- 7 May 1981 Magpie company, Playhouse Festival Centre, Adelaide, directed by Malcolm Moore
- 5 August 1985, Church Theatre Hawthorn, Melbourne, directed by John Wood
- 14 March 1987, Playhouse Theatre, Perth
- 11 November 1987, Bridge Theatre, Wollongong NSW
- 24 December 1987, Theatre South. Zenith Theatre, Chatswood
- 8 January 2009, Perilous Productions. Northcote Town Hall, Melbourne, directed by Suzanne Chaundy
- 16 January 2018. Theatre South. Zenith Theatre, Chatswood

Golden Valley was the first play performed at the new Zenith Theatre in Chatswood. Theatre South was a Wollongong regional theatre company that also produced The Man from Mukinupin.

Perilous Productions was formed to revive the works of Hewett. In the Northcote production, every cast member sang, danced and played a musical instrument.

== Awards ==
1982 AWGIE Children's original play script

== Resources ==
Dorothy Hewett (1985). Golden Valley; Song of the Seals. Currency Press.
