= This Old Man Comes Rolling Home =

1965 play by Dorothy Hewett

- Original language: English
- Written by: Dorothy Hewett
- Subject: Low-income communities
- Genre: Comedy-drama
- Setting: Inner-suburban street

Premiere
- Date: 1967
- Place: Perth, Western Australia

This Old Man Comes Rolling Home, Dorothy Hewett's first full-length play, was written in 1965. It captures the spirit and character of Redfern, an inner-city suburb of Sydney sometimes called "Australia's last slum". The play is a slice of life, following about six months in the life of the Dockertys, an extended family of seven children and partners, during the early 1950s. The family is subject to various stresses, most significantly because the mother is an alcoholic, largely lost in dreams of her youth.

The play is as much about language as plot, and contains engaging and humorous quotations in the Australian idiom of the time. The dialogue consists of interactions between the family members, or it evokes a mystical Sydney expressed by a chorus of old ladies and an Old Man.

== Characters ==
- Tom Dockerty: Boilermaker aged 55–60, full of Falstaffian optimism
- Laurie Dockerty: The former "Belle of Bundaberg", now lost, alcoholic and fiftyish
- George Dockerty: Eldest son, about 30, car salesman, flashy and cunning. In the eyes of his mother, George can do no wrong
- Julie Dockerty: Eldest daughter, aged 25, intelligent and forceful
- Landy Dockerty: Second son, aged 21, gentle, sensitive and naive
- Pet Dockerty: Second daughter, about 20, intellectually disabled but sexually active
- Don Dockerty: Third son, about 18, sharp dresser, unemployed, thief
- Joycee Dockerty: Youngest daughter, about 1314, tough and comic
- Snowy Baker: Julie's boyfriend, about 28, an ex-convict who quotes poetry. Tough-gentle, brought up on the streets of Redfern
- Edie Dockerty: Landy's wife, aged 16, practical, strong and earthy
- Fay: Don's girlfriend, about 18–19, English migrant, simple and innocent
- Daisy, Violet, Pansy: Three old women, the "Greek chorus" of Redfern
- The Old Man: Mythical character, 70–80. Asleep on the park bench for much of the play
- Flower seller, Policeman, Doctor

== Setting ==
A wide stage with an apron front, representing a street in Redfern. To the right is a park outlined by a park seat saying "Ladies Only", a brick wall and a sign saying "Pub". In the centre is an open-fronted living room, with staircases leading up to bedrooms. The room has old furniture, household detritus, some Communist literature, and one picture, of a radiant Laurie as the Belle of Bundaberg.

== Synopsis ==
=== Act I ===
Redfern early 1950s. A series of scenes without curtain.

A macabre group of children dance and sing around the Old Man, who is asleep. Laurie, swigging sweet sherry, dreams of her glory days as the Belle of Bundaberg. Her husband Tom comes home and complains the place is squalid and the food is inedible. Landy the second son and Edie his girlfriend enter, saying they are expecting a baby and need to marry. They ask Tom to convince Edie's mother, as Edie is only 16. Tom says that's how he caught Laurie, aged 17. Laurie warns Edie she will end up like she has. Landy tells Laurie her health issues are all due to alcohol. After they all leave Laurie dances round with her bottle.

The chorus Daisy, Pansy and Violet enter from the pub, and talk about drinking, slum clearance, the weather, the old man on the bench, and their memories of the Redfern community. Don enters and chases out the chorus. He tells his mother to show some dignity, and heads upstairs.

Tom, Landy, Edie and her mother Mrs Keeler arrive. Tom says the young ones are old enough to know their own minds and let them marry. Edie's mother calls Edie a 'dirty thing' and a trollop. Laurie wakes up and suggests an abortion. Mrs Keeler backs off. They all welcome Edie into the Dockertys and Landy and Edie move in.

Pet the second daughter turns up with a pram, saying her husband has left her, and moves in. Laurie gives the baby a bottle and sings a lullaby. She keeps drinking and sings "Oh Sydney I love you" with the Old Man.

=== Act II ===
==== Scene 1. Five months later, early spring ====
Tom is painting the house, singing "The Red Flag". He is joined by his "offsider" Snowy, who has come to see Julie the eldest daughter. Snowy has "done time". George the eldest son enters, he has married an older woman with money. Tom and Laurie fight about George's character. Don enters, Laurie is missing a bracelet and accuses Don of stealing it. Edie says she can't take it, doing all the housework for everyone and looking after Pet's baby as well, and says she has to move out. Pet takes her baby back to her husband. Julie arrives from apple-picking in Tasmania with her English friend, Fay. Snowy recites bush poetry with Julie. Everyone dances or sings. Julie tells Fay they are all mad but lovable. Don gives Fay a bracelet (presumably his mother's). Laurie recites "The Lady of Shalott".

==== Scene 2. Some weeks later ====
Don likes Fay because she is "easy". Tom tells Julie that Snow has been in jail. Snowy and Julie get together and go to the pub. Tom and Joycee go out to paint slogans. Tom runs off and the police bribe Joycee with lollies, but she misdirects them. Edie goes into labour and Joycee tries to get Laurie to help, but she is too drunk. A neighbour is found.

=== Act III ===
==== Scene 1. A week later ====
Don tries to shake off Fay, as they've "had their fun", but Fay is pregnant. Don tells her to get an abortion, and to pay for it with the bracelet. Fay says she'll kill herself and haunt him. They exit. Tom enters drunk. He has punched the foreman while defending Snowy and he has been given the sack. Julie tells Tom and Snowy they are both weak. She cries as Snowy leaves. A policeman arrives and Don thinks Fay must have committed suicide. Tom pushes Don at Laurie in disgust, but she is lost in dreams of Bundaberg. The police arrest Don over stolen jewellery.

==== Scene 2. A week later, early summer. ====
Snowy recites bush poetry at Julie's window, saying he's off North. Julie talks wistfully to the Old Man. George enters, is asked for money and calls them all parasites. Laurie orders him out. George gives Laurie a fiver "for herself" . Landy and Edie, now with a baby, give up their house deposit for Don's legal defence. Laurie goes down the pub with her fiver. The chorus enter, talking about weather and old age. It is revealed that Fay died of an illegal abortion. The workers in the plant recover Tom's job by working to regulation. Laurie returns with the pram half-filled with bottles and they all sing "Wild Rover". Pet turns up pregnant again. The Old Man speaks of people breeding and dying like sparrows.

== Quotations ==
- "A wreck of an 'at on a wreck of a face on the wreck of the prettiest girl in Bundaberg."
- "The poor little bitch couldn't even spell 'cat'."
- "You don't love me Donny." "I love what y' got Fay."
- "The only time you can be alone in Redfern is in the spring."
- "You couldn't haunt pussy."
- "It ain't tatticks"
- "I've done me dough and washed me socks and that's it."
- "Only the drunks dare to tell the truth."
- "Even when she was dying, right up to the last they fed her warm milk out of an eyedropper."
- "The only man who was ever saved by three hundred three-minute pees."

== Performances ==
The first performance was in 1967 in the New Fortune Theatre at the University of Western Australia. The lead roles were Neville Teede as Tom and Joan Bruce as Laurie. The first performance by a professional company was in 1968 at the Old Tote in Sydney, directed by Jean Wilhelm and starred Ron Haddrick as Tom and Betty Lucas as Laurie. It was the first time the Old Tote had produced a play by a woman also directed by a woman.

- 11–21 January 1967. New Fortune Theatre, Perth. WA University Dramatic Society. Director Frank Baden Powell
- 19 March 1968. Old Tote Theatre, Sydney. Director Jean Wilhelm
- 21 June 1977. Union Theatre, Melbourne. Trinity. Director Ian Robinson
- 3–12 July 1980. St Jude's Players, Brighton SA. Director Gary Anderson
- 6–28 August 1982. La Boite Theatre, Brisbane. Director Margaret Davis
- 16–24 May 1984. NIDA. Parade Theatre. Director Kevin Jackson
- 11–25 April 1986. The Chester Street Theatre Group, Sydney. Director Kathleen Warren
- 28 May–June 27, 1987. The Rocks Players, Sydney. Director Julie Dunsmore
- 25 August–22 September 1990. Russell St Theatre, Melbourne. Melbourne Theatre Company. Director Gale Edwards
- 21 February 1992. Pumpkin Theatre, Richmond Vic.
- 9–26 July 2003 Heidelberg Theatre, Melbourne. Director Gayle Poor
- 17 July–3 August 2013. Bakehouse Theatre, Adelaide. Director Ross Vosvotekas
- 15–19 May 2018. Playhouse Theatre, Sydney. NUTS NIDA. Director Casuarina O'Brien

== Background and critical response ==
=== Initial productions ===
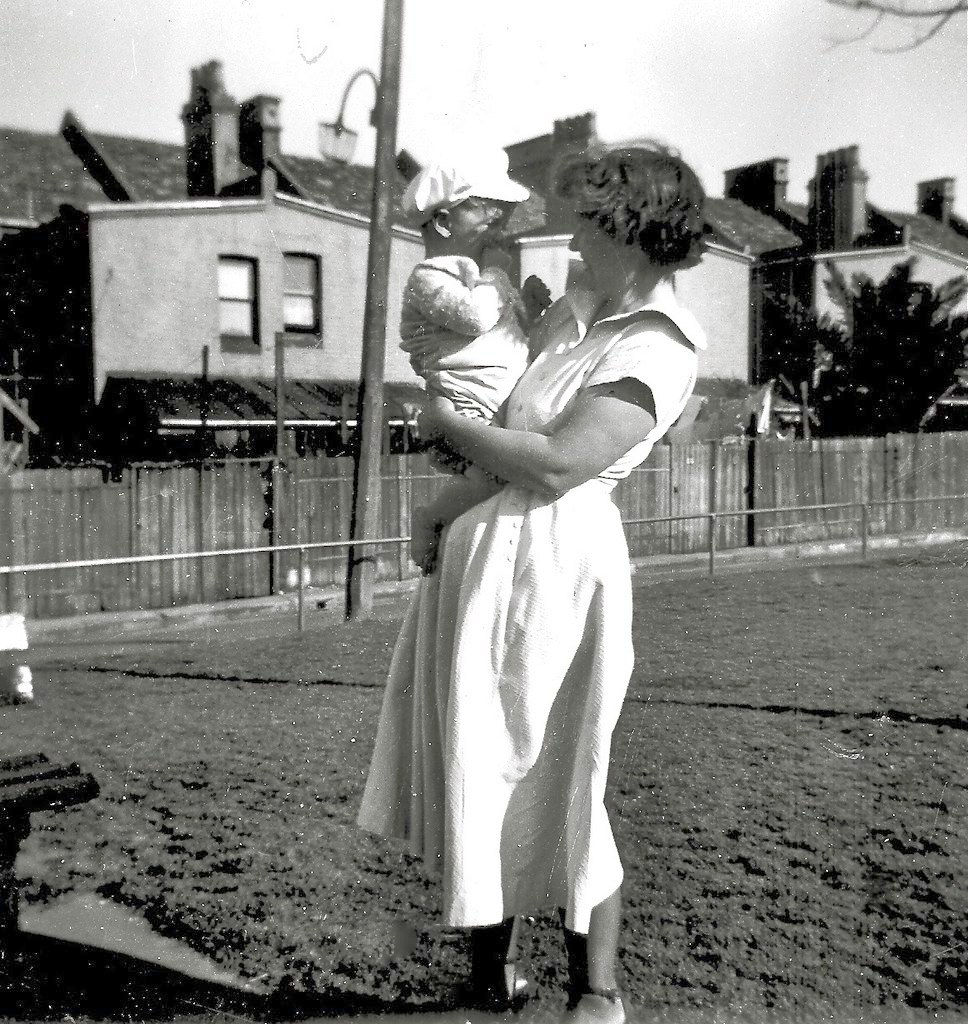
Dorothy Hewett and baby Joe Flood, Redfern 1951. Joe became an international authority on slums

Hewett wrote the first draft of "This Old Man", her first full-length play, in 1957, but it was burned with all her other work in early 1958 by her partner Les Flood. She resumed the play in her university room overlooking the New Fortune Theatre while she was supposed to be working on her Masters of Arts Thesis. It was submitted under the pseudonym of "Liz Trigg" to the Mary Gilmore Award for a three-act play in 1964, and commended.

She had lived in Redfern from 1949 to 1952, and was impressed by the indomitable spirit, resilience and camaraderie of the working-poor community of Redfern, who lived under vulnerable and difficult slum conditions. The Dockertys were based on a family who lived just down the street.

The play is written in the style of romantic naturalism, with "symbolism, surrealism and theatricality". There are touches of socialist realism, in the elevation of the working class, the disparagement of class traitors like George, the industrial action to save Tom's job, and the slogan writing episode. The Greek chorus of women from the Hen's Lounge and the recitals of bush poetry were departures from the expected style of the time. English-trained actors had difficulty coming to terms with the idiom and accents of traditional Australian culture.

Apart from the fairytale elements, the play was a fair description of family life in a disadvantaged area, when one of the adults is disabled by alcoholism. The critically acclaimed British and American TV series "Shameless", shown from 2004, had a similar theme and dynamic.

Even in 1968, at the time of the first Sydney performance, the "old Sydney" and its slums were disappearing. The influential theatre critic Harry Kippax was famously heard to say when departing the theatre, "Old old old, get me a taxi." Challenged as being out-of-date, Hewett seldom wrote about the urban working class again.

=== Later productions ===
The 'battlers' (usually the white urban working poor) have been steadily disappearing in Australia, as incomes have improved and the base for immigration has broadened. This might have meant that the play would not be relevant to the 21st century. However, the nostalgia for lost Australian idiom and culture has grown, and the humour and language of the author has retained the interest of audiences. The play has continued to be produced for over 50 years, attracting good audiences.

In 2013 an Adelaide production of "This Old Man" was advertised almost as a curiosity, as a "legend of Australian theatre". A feminist critic pointed out, "The greatest victims in this piece are the women who do not have the power to shape their own destiny". A young critic stated, "Almost everything else (alcoholism, poverty, marriage, politics) is depicted to garish extremity. A modern middle-class theatre-going audience is left bewildered and alienated". Yet the play accurately depicts an Australia remembered by many living Australians – and its circumstances are familiar to a billion slum dwellers throughout the world.

== Publication ==
- Hewett, Dorothy (1976), This Old Man Comes Rolling Home, Currency Press; London : Eyre Methuen, ISBN 978-0-86937-049-0
- Hewett, Dorothy (1992), "This Old Man Comes Rolling Home", Collected plays. Volume 1, Currency Press, ISBN 978-0-86819-166-9
