= Kate Moore (composer) =

Australian composer (born 1979)

Kate Moore (born 1979) is an Australian composer currently based in the Netherlands. Moore was born in Oxfordshire, England, and has studied with Australian composers Larry Sitsky, Jim Cotter, and Michael Smetanin; Dutch composers Louis Andriessen, Martijn Padding, Diderik Wagenaar and Gilius van Bergeijk; and attended summer schools including Bang on a Can hosted by David Lang, Julia Wolfe and Michael Gordon and Tanglewood hosted by John Harbison, Michael Gandolfi and Helen Grime.

In 2022 Moore was awarded the Gieskes-Strijbis Podiumprijs. In June 2017, Moore became the first woman to win the Matthijs Vermeulen Award from the Netherlands Funds for the Performing Arts FPK for her work The Dam, in its version for British ensemble Icebreaker.

== List of works ==
=== Major works ===
- Frieda's Reis, Cello Concerto (2023) Commissioned by the Amsterdam Cello Biennale
- Piano Concerto (2019) Commissioned by Willoughby Symphony Orchestra for soloist Vivian Choi
- Space Junk (2019) Commissioned by ASKO Schoenberg for the World Minimal Music Festival
- Bosch Requiem: Lux Aeterna (2015–2018) Commissioned by November Music, Bach Festival Dordrecht, Temko
- Cassini Suite (2015–2017) Commissioned and performed by Slagwerk Den Haag
- Sacred Environment (2015–2017), Commissioned by the Holland Festival for the Netherlands Radio Philharmonic Orchestra and Groot Omroepkoor
- Herz Dance Cycle (2015–2016) Dance cycle
- Restraint(s) Dance Cycle (2017) Dance cycle
- Stories for Ocean Shells (2000–2015) Cello cycle
- Dances and Canons (2000–2013) Piano cycle
- The Open Road (2008) Song cycle
- Debris and Alchemy (2009)
- Violins and Skeletons (2010)
- Cello Concerto (2010–2013)
- Eclipsed Vision (2006)

=== Orchestral and large ensemble ===
- Sacred Environment, An Oratorio, 2017 Commissioned by The Holland Festival for The Netherlands Radio Philharmonic Orchestra (RFO)
- The Dam, (2015) Commissioned for The Canberra International Music Festival
- Cello Concerto, (2014) Commissioned by Föreningen Kammarmusik NU, Stockholm
- The Art of Levitation, (2013) Commissioned by Carnegie Hall
- Days & Nature, (2012) Commissioned by Fonds Podiumkunsten for ASKO
- Engraved in Stone, (2012) Commissioned by Fonds Podiumkunsten
- Klepsydra, (2009) Commissioned by Fonds Podiumkunsten for ASKO
- In that house they shall enter, in that house they shall dwell, (2006) Commissioned by De Ereprijs Orkest duration

=== Chamber ensemble ===
- Porcelain (2017) Commissioned by Slagwerk Den Haag
- Bushranger Psychodrama (2017) Co-commissioned by November music, Symphony Space, Dublin Concert Hall
- Restraint(s) (2017) Commissioned by Ken Unsworth
- Stroming, (2017) Commissioned by BRISK
- Herz (dance cycle), (2015–16), Commissioned by the Stolz Trio & Leina Roebana with assistance from, Fonds Podiumkunsten NL
- Three Letters, (2015)
- One Minute According to Your Heart (2015), Commissioned by Synergy Percussion 40U40
- Oil Drms, (2014), Commissioned by Decibel
- Mobile & Sculpture, (2013), Commissioned by Nieuw Ensemble
- Fern, (2013), Co-commissioned by The Australia Council for The Arts and Amsterdam Sinfonietta & Slagwerk Den Haag
- House of Shards and Shadows, (2013), Commissioned by Fonds Podiumkunsten
- Sarabande, (2013), Commissioned by Synergy Percussion,
- Sphinx, (2013), Commissioned by The Amsterdam Cello Octet
- Pelicans, (2011), Commissioned by Trio Scordatura with assistance from FPK
- Fatal Strangers, (2011), Commissioned by Ensemble Lucilin
- No man's Land, (2011), Commissioned by Fonds Podiumkunsten
- Violins & Skeletons, (2010), Co-Commissioned by The Carlsbad Festival of Music and ARTPWR
- Velvet, (2009)
- Ridgeway, (2009), Commissioned by The People's Commissioning Fund at Bang on a Can for The Bang on a Can
- The Open Road, (2008) Song Cycle
- Uisce, (2007)
- Antechamber, (2007)
- The Regarding Room (2005)
- 101, (2003)
- Sketches of Stars, (2000), Winner: Franco-Australian Composition Competition
- Stories for Ocean Shells, (2000), Commissioned by ASCA,

=== Solo ===
- Coral Speak, (2016), commissioned by Louise Devenish
- Bestiary, (2016) commissioned by Zubin Kanga,
- Drie Segel Hat Mein Herz, (2015), Commissioned for Vox Sanguinis (November Music)
- Sliabh Beagh, (2015), Commissioned by Lisa Moore with assistance from The Australia Council for The Arts
- Rose, (2015), Commissioned by The Holland Festival
- Bloodmoon October, (2014)
- Synaesthesia Suite, (2014), Commissioned by Ben Remkes Cultuurfonds
- Heather, (2014) Commissioned by Julian Burnside QC
- Telephone (2014), Written for Louis Andriessen 75 birthday
- Dolorosa, (2014), Commissioned by Fonds Podiumkunsten
- Canon, (2013)
- The Hermit Thrush & The Astronaut, (2012)
- The body is an ear, (2011), Commissioned by Stichting Het Orgelpark, Amsterdam
- Velvet, (2010), Commissioned by The Australia Council for The Arts
- Broken Rosary, (2010), (From Songs for Maria Epskamp), Commissioned by The Holland Sinfonia
- Spin Bird, (2008), (for solo harp)
- Zomer, (2006), (for solo piano)
- Joy, (2003), (for solo piano)
- Red Flame Hlue Flame, (2003), (for solo clarinet), Commissioned by Apeldoorn Young Composer Meeting
- Melodrama, (2001), (for solo piano)
- Rain, (1998), (for solo snare drum)
- Homage to my boots, (1998), (for solo cello)

=== Electro acoustic ===
- Voiceworks I, (2015), Commissioned by icinema UNSW, Stereo
- Voiceworks II, (2015), Commissioned by icinema UNSW, Stereo
- Luna Park, (2009), Commissioned by Fonds Podiumkunsten for Lunapark, Stereo
- Empty, (2001)
- Satellites, (2000)
- Sentience , (2000)
- Sand, (1998)
- Scuttly Things, (1998)

=== Instruments, sound sculptures and installations ===
- Porcelain Project, (2016)
- Coral Speak, (2016), Commissioned by Louise Devenish WA
- Electric Mudflutes, (2015)
- Bone China, (2014),
- To That Which is Endless, (2013)
- Zandorgel, (2010),
- Klepsydra Instrument, (2009)
- Klepsydra Sculptures, (2009)
- PUUR, (2008)
- Uisce, (2007)
- Eclipsed Vision, (2006)
- Sensitive Spot, (2005)

=== Film, dance and theatre ===
==== Dance ====
- October Restraints Ken Unsworth Studio Sydney (2017)
- National Dutch tour Seele Herz/ Loud Shadows Liquid Events, Stolz Quartet and Leine Roebana Dance Company (2016–2017)
- Paradise Lost Korzo Theater production choreographer by Samir Calixto (2015)
- 3×3 choreographed by Samir Claixto (2012)
- PUUR Korzo Theater production choreographed by Neel Verdoorn (2008)

==== Theater ====
- The Open Road Korzo Theater Production directed by Matthias Mooij (2008/10)
- De Stad Korzo Theater Production directed by Matthias Mooij (2007)

==== Film ====
- Nebula, interactive AI 3D cinema, dir. Dennis del Favero, icinema, Australia
- i-land/atmoscape, interactive cinema, dir. Dennis del Favero, icinema, Australia
- Scenario, interactive cinema, dir. Dennis del Favero, Icinema, The Sydney Film Festival, Australia
- Firewall
- Lenz
- Cassandra
- Deep Heat
- Deep Sleep, dir Dennis del Favero, icinema, Australia
- Limbo, dir. Dennis del Favero, icinema, UNSW, Australia
- Todtnauberg
- Descartes
