= Bobbin Up =

1959 novel by Dorothy Hewett

- Author: Dorothy Hewett
- Subject: working-class women
- Genre: Socialist realism
- Set in: Inner Sydney
- Publisher: Australasian Book Society
- Publication date: 1959

Bobbin Up was the first novel by the author Dorothy Hewett (1923-2002). It is set in 1957 in a spinning mill in Alexandria, an industrial suburb of inner Sydney, and describes the lives of fifteen working-class women who work there for breadline wages. The novel is a series of loosely connected vignettes, where the life of each woman and her family is described within one or two chapters. The book concludes with a stay-in strike by the women for reinstatement after a mass layoff. Most of the group appear together in the final chapter.

As one of the few novels to give an accurate first-hand account of the lives of female industrial workers in the 1950s, it has continued to be studied.

== Synopsis ==
A group of women sweat in the Jumbuck Woollen Mills in Sydney for breadline wages. The whistle blows grime is washed from faces, hair combed, lipstick applied and the workers emerge, women again, leaving the factory behind them, into the evening streets, flashing neon lights and the journey home to families and lovers. Among them are Shirl, nineteen and four months pregnant; Dawnie, beautiful and fiercely chaste; Patty, singing in the dance halls; and Nell, an active Communist Party member. These women have their own dreams: but a common spirit binds them, and with Nell as their leader they come together for the fight which lies ahead.

== Chapters ==
The book is divided into one- or two-chapter vignettes.

1. Shirl is 19, and living in a world of neon and tattoo slogans. As one of nine children (one dead and five on the State) of a widowed mother Violet, she has been in and out of welfare homes until she could get a factory job. She brings a new boyfriend home to obtain her “broad swollen” mother's permission to marry. Two years earlier she had a baby, but the father is brain-damaged in a motorbike accident and the baby is born with "water on the brain".
2. There is a heat wave in Sydney. Women wash their legs in basins after work while the men watch. One of them is Beth, a "golden-skinned, cropped headed" woman from Perth; her husband Len works as a welder on the docks. She is pregnant and the other women get her a seat on the crowded bus. They rent a room in a two-story boarding house and she has troubles climbing the stairs. They eat with Lou the landlady, and her husband Hughie. Hughie's birthday, he is 72 and brings out the home brew. Their daughter and teenage granddaughter turn up. Another boarder, old Polly, is "a travesty of a woman" who doesn't bathe. She leases a house in Redfern, but is afraid to return as her mother starved there. Lou wants Beth and Len to move there, as she already has a couple with a baby.
3. Beth and Len window-shop in Oxford Street, looking at the dresses, the cars and the model kitchens. dreaming of setting it all up in Centennial Park near the old deadbeats. They look at Polly's house, hoping to move in. Back at Lou's, a small bat flies in. Hughie, dressed in truncheon and tin hat, wrestles with a new boarder Olga in the garden, seeking sex. Sputnik flies past.
4. Dawnie teases Kennie, the foreman's assistant, saying that he is a flunky and a mumma's boy, while he wrestles with her. Dick the foreman says Dawnie is foulmouthed. At home, her mother Hazel is in a loose-hanging kimono and stretches herself on the day bed . There is talk of atomic testing changing the weather. Hazel has three lovely daughters and Dawn a 16 is the youngest.They love Hazel for her rough tenderness and courage, but reject her for her amorality and booze. Ken and a new, warm, demure Dawnie head for Bondi, “a great dark, silken heaving surf in the heart of Sydney”. They body surf and she rejects Ken's advances, They dance and Dawnie wants to stay on the beach, but then she suggests they get a room.
5. Dawn and Kennie take a cheap ugly room. Dawnie is terrified and runs to the far side of the room, saying she "can’t". They go home and step over heaps of broken glass, spilled beer and bottles. Hazel is in bed with a man.
6. The sisters Alice and Beryl rent an attic. Beryl is dating a policeman, Frank, who comes to dinner. Alice is a war widow who has become asthmatic at the mill. The radio announces a large-scale recession in the textile industry. After Sputnik rounds the sky, a little man chalks “Eternity” at dawn outside the ice works.
7. Lil, a wiry brisk woman in her 60s, struggles past the traffic to her room in Redfern. Lil had a sideshow contortionist act with her ex-husband Kel, a drunk ex-boxer, until the alcohol and gambling "got him". Kel comes at 2 am and throws milk bottles at her room. Lil throws water on him, and then she wanders out onto the night streets.
8. Jessie and Julie complain about Kennie, who hands around pornographic photos at the mill. They take the tram and train to Tempe. Jessie has seven kids with Bert, who was blinded in a work accident. Her daughter Lynne has a bad marriage and a crying baby, and won't go home.
9. Patty is 16 and wants to be a singer. She goes home with her sister Jean, aged 28. Jean was co-opted into activism and spent years of being taunted as a “dirty Commo”, now she dreams of owning a fibro house out in Blacktown. Their parents lives next to the Erskineville train. Patty and her friend Val set off for the hall, through a row of appraising boys. The girls dance and Patty sings at the mike. Val accepts a motorbike lift from a “bodgie”. Patty's mother Peg is pregnant. Her husband Tom, a wharf labourer, wakes her to see Sputnik. Tom feels he is part of the great army of toilers that put Sputnik there, and says he will join the Communist Party.
10. Maisie is a very tall, morbidly aspirational woman who works two jobs, from 7 am to 9 pm. She has organised her husband Vic to work in the Pasadena Driving School, and her mother into California Caterers. Tonight Vic is drunk and drives around, vomiting on the beach. Maisie fights with Vic, who thinks she is “slovenly, insolent and rotten” and with her mother, who says she is "going off her head". A plane roars overhead and Maisie begins screaming.
11. Nell is 35 years old, has three children and is vain about her waistline. Her husband Stan has written her a bulletin for staging agitprop at the mill. A major textile industry downturn is announced on the radio, with workers to be rostered only 2–3 days per week. The Party branch turn up at the house and the women suggest improvements to the text. They retype the stencil, then Gestetner and fold the bulletin till well after midnight.
12. Nell's union and strike experience is described. Stan is a boilermaker, musician and former pilot. He comes home early as he has lost his job. They troop outside to see Sputnik. Stan reviews his life and is afraid his union won't support him.
13. After the knock-off whistle, only four New Australian refugees are working. The old hand Betty tells her 17 year old trainee Gwennie she will have her own machine tomorrow. Gwennie fell pregnant to a sailor after a night of “fumbling incoherent sex” during shore leave, but wants to keep her child. She shares a room with Dorrie from the spinning group. Dorrie tells Gwennie to be practical and have an abortion, then goes out to meet a couple of American sailors and does not come home. Bea Miles, the legendary Kings Cross character, takes oranges without paying and recites Hamlet’s soliloquy for two shillings.
14. Julie had been an acrobatic dancer, but has put on a lot of weight after having three children. She thinks married women shouldn’t work, but she has to pay the bills. Johnny, their epileptic child has taken most of the family energy from looking after him. The most senior of the doctors said Johnny was hopelessly retarded and that they should put him in a home. As the mill workers arrive at work, they take a leaflet and hide them down the front of their dress.
15. Many of the workers have lung and other health problems, and conditions are risky. One woman fainted today, one caught her hair in a machine and was nearly scalped. Jeanie is called to the office by her husband. It seems that their war service home won't be built for years because the council hasn’t constructed the water reticulation. Her dream is fading.
16. It is Friday and they collect their pay. Everyone is sacked except single girls and young widows, and those that remain are all on short-time. Nell calls them all to a meeting. They are shocked and angry; they work hard but they get cheated and sacked and pushed around. Old Betty, a right winger and “trusty”, says to fight back. They decide to do a work-in strike for reinstatement. Maisie tries to keep working but stops under pressure from the strikers, as do the New Australians. They waver over Shirl, who is to be married that night, but she says she never lets her mates down. Patty sings, "we've got the whole world in our hands".

The book finishes on an open-ended note, stating that even if they get nowhere, at least they stayed together. They are "in for a long wait".

== Language ==
Like Hewett's first full-length play This Old Man Comes Rolling Home, which was first drafted around the same time, the language is a "chorus of rich vernacular voices", alternating between 1950s Australian urban argot, descriptions of the struggle to survive, and wistful evocations of the place and the era. A few examples include:

- Shirl was 19 years old, three months gone and just starting to show, bumping through Newtown on the back of a second-hand Norton.
- Wash it all away...down the plughole, out the water pipes, down the storm-water channel into the Pacific Ocean...all the sneers and snide whispers, all the constant, grinding struggle to keep on top of it all.
- At 4:36 am Sputnik whirled across the north western sky at 30 degrees. The baby kicked and the earth turned, there was the soft squeak of a door opening, a whisper and a kiss.

== Background and history ==
When Hewett arrived in Sydney in 1949 with her boilermaker partner Les Flood, she told the Communist Party organiser in a “vague utopian gesture” that she wanted a job in “the worst factory in Sydney”. She was sent to the second-worst: the Alexandria Spinning Mills. There, she acted as union representative for the right-wing Textile Workers Union until she became too pregnant and was laid off.

Hewett was President of the leftist Sydney Realist Writers Group, founded by the writer Frank Hardy. Hardy issued Hewett a challenge for them both to write a novel in eight weeks for entry in the Mary Gilmour Literary Competition in 1958. She wrote the book between jobs on her kitchen table during “the coldest Sydney winter on record", warming her hands over the gas stove to type, because she had run out of money and coal.

The book was rejected by the first panel of judges in the competition but was found in a cupboard. She won second prize. The judges (who included Alan Marshall and Stephen Murray-Smith) stated the book was "by far the most successful novel of the militant labour movement that we have read".

A print run of 3000 copies was made by the Australasian Book Society, which sold out in six weeks. Seven Seas Books in Berlin published it for export in 1961, after which it was published under various titles in Hungarian, Russian, German, Czech, Bulgarian and Romanian. It was published twice more in English, as a Virago Modern Classic in 1987, and by Vulgar Press in 1999.

The novel continues to be analysed as "a historical object" by later generations of academics.

== Setting ==
The novel "paints a convincing picture of those dreary inner suburbs of Sydney near the north west corner of Botany Bay, a locality which for many years signified a God-forsaken place of exile". It is set nominally in late 1957, the year of Sputnik I. The setting never approaches Sydney's most famous feature, Sydney Harbour, although there is a surfing interlude at Bondi Beach during the heatwave.

The book features two avatars of Hewett, The first, "golden-skinned, cropped headed Beth" in Chapters 2 and 3, is actually taken from 1950 when Hewett first came to Sydney with Flood, became pregnant and was living in the shabby boarding house at Moncur St Woollahra, while working in the spinning mills. Her experiences there are also described in the autobiography Wild Card and in the poem/song "In Moncur Street". The second appearance of Hewett is as the union activist Nell in Chapters 11 and 12.

There are cameo appearances by Sydney eccentrics Bea Miles in Chapter 14, and Arthur Stace in Chapter 6. From the Wikipedia articles on these iconic Sydney eccentrics, Bobbin Up may be their first mentions in popular culture. Stace's signature "Eternity" was picked up by the artist Martin Sharp and became a symbol of Sydney in the 2000 Olympic Games opening ceremony and Millennium celebrations.

== Criticism ==
After publication, the book was discussed in Communist Party "cottage meetings" and public gatherings. A typical response in 1959 from the Townsville Cultural Group applauded the novel as a contribution to working-class literature:

the surging vitality of the novel, the gripping picture it gives of parts of Sydney and some aspects of Sydney life, characterisation and the realistic nature of the dialogue. Opposing views were expressed about the treatment of Communists. Some considered that the book gave a true, un-idealistic picture of Communists, others that it gave a true picture of Communists in that particular environment, but should not be taken as a conclusive picture of the way Communists in general work in industry. The narrowness of its scope ensured that it could by no means be regarded as a book on the textile industry as a whole. An aspect of the book deplored by almost all was "over-emphasis" placed on the sex angle.

Mainstream sources of the time could be patronising, with articles leading as “Busy housewife finds time for writing” or describing the author as "a fat zany blonde". Sydney Baker from the Sydney Morning Herald was more balanced, agreeing the book presented "a vivid series of pictures of working women presented with wry humour and without sentiment" while decrying the "spurious ending", stating "If Miss Hewett had been able to resist the temptation to convert the stay-in strike at the end of her 'novel' into a banal outlet for communist propaganda, it would have been remarkably good.”

Once she left the Communist Party, Hewett felt "something close to revulsion" at the political content of the book. She said in 1976:

It embarrasses me because I think it's very naive and quite dangerously dishonest in parts. But there are sections of it which do attempt...to record the lives of working class girls as they were in Sydney at that time. Those parts were quite realistic and quite true. It's the political part which I think was sentimentalized and untrue.

The feminist critique is not contemporaneous and did not emerge until the 1970s. The women's view is always to the forefront in the book, which attempts to describe real conditions in Sydney in the 1950s. At that time, many working-class women fell accidentally pregnant, wages were very low, married women were routinely sacked and some men would attempt to assault single women arbitrarily for sex if so inclined.

The lack of a real protagonist among the book's many characters, each of whom appears in one or two chapters plus the finale, has led Bobbin Up to be called by Hewett and others "not a novel", but a cycle of short stories. In 1979, Hewett cited her influences as Zola's Germinal and particularly Winesburg Ohio by Sherwood Anderson, which adopted a similar format. By 1987, she stated she "intended the novel to be about a group of mill workers whose lives intersected at the mill then separated when the whistle blew", and she considered the loose and episodic form to be perfect for the subject matter. Stephen Knight agreed, saying, "The characters coexist, like threads of a larger pattern, not being organised in tiers of importance".

== Editions ==
- 1959 Australasian Book Society
- 1961 Seven Seas Berlin; Also in German, Hungarian, Russian, Romanian, Czech, Polish, and Bulgarian during 1961-1965.
- In Netherlands in 1962.
- 1987 Virago Modern Classics
- 1999 Vulgar Press 40th Anniversary edition.

== Adaptations ==
A musical Bobbin' Up written by Nick Enright was based on the book. It has been performed three times

- 1993 NIDA Theatre, University of NSW, third-year drama students
- 1993 Western Australian Academy of Performing Arts, Mount Lawley
- 2005 Western Australian Academy of Performing Arts, Outdoor Amphitheatre
