= Juliet McMaster =

- Born: 1937 (age 88–89); Kakuma, Kenya
- Spouse: Rowland D. McMaster
- Relatives: James Clarke Hook

Academic background
- Education: B.A., University of Oxford; M.A., 1963, PhD., 1965, University of Alberta

Academic work
- Discipline: Jane Austen
- Institutions: University of Alberta

Juliet McMaster FRSC (born 1937) is a Canadian scholar of eighteenth and nineteenth-century English literature, a specialist in Jane Austen, and Full Professor at the University of Alberta.

== Early life and education ==
Juliet McMaster was born in Kenya in 1937, and is a descendant of the Victorian painter James Clarke Hook. She earned a Bachelor of Arts in English at St. Anne's College in Oxford. After emigrating to Canada in 1961, she received her Master's degree and PhD at the University of Alberta, where she was the Faculty of Art's first PhD graduate.

== Career ==
McMaster joined the University of Alberta as an assistant professor of English in 1965. In addition to teaching literature and theatre studies, she also taught a fencing course in the theatre department. McMaster eventually achieved the rank of Full Professor in 1986. The following year, she received a Killam Research Fellowship from the Canada Council for the Arts from 1987 to 1989.

McMaster was the founding President of the Victorian Studies Association of Western Canada in 1973. The following year, she republished her thesis through the University of Toronto Press into her first book titled Thackeray: The Major Novels. She also served as president of ACUTE (Association of Canadian University Teachers in English) from 1976 to 1978. During this time, McMaster published various books such as Jane Austen’s Achievement and Jane Austen on Love. The first of these novels, Jane Austen’s Achievement, which she edited in 1976, was a collection of papers delivered at the Jane Austen Bicentennial Conference at the University of Alberta. The second novel, Jane Austen on Love was a short collection of essays on the theme of love in Austen's novels. In the same year as Jane Austen on Love was published, McMaster was elected a Fellow of the Royal Society of Canada.

McMaster founded a pedagogical press, Juvenilia Press in 1994. Publishing the early works of established writers, Juvenilia Press involves students in the editorial, annotation, illustration and design of editions under the supervision of experienced scholars.

== Personal life ==
An avid fencer, McMaster qualified for a place on Canada's fencing team in 1965, after placing second in the National fencing championships. She was named the athlete of the year at the University of Alberta in the same year. She returned to the sport at the age of 77, and was an active member of the Edmonton Fencing Club.

She is married to Rowland D. McMaster.

== Books ==
- McMaster, Juliet (1976). Jane Austen's Achievement. London: Palgrave Macmillan, a division of Macmillan Publishers Limited. ISBN 978-1-349-03102-3.
- McMaster, Juliet (1978). Jane Austen on love. Victoria, B.C.: English Literary Studies, University of Victoria. ISBN 978-0-920604-24-3.
- McMaster, Juliet (1978). Trollope's Palliser novels: Theme and pattern. London: Macmillan.
- McMaster, Juliet; Thackeray, William Makepeace (1981). "Bluebeard at breakfast": an unpublished Thackeray manuscript. Carbondale, Illinois: Southern Illinois University Press.
- McMaster, Juliet (1990). The index of the mind: physiognomy in the novel. Lethbridge, Alta.: University of Lethbridge Press. ISBN 978-0-919555-66-2.
- McMaster, Juliet (1995). Thackeray: the major novels. Ann Arbor, MI: UMI Books on Demand.
- McMaster, Juliet (1996). Jane Austen the novelist: essays past and present. Basingstoke, Hampshire; New York: Macmillan Press; St. Martin's Press. ISBN 978-0-230-37546-8.
- McMaster, Juliet (2000). Index of the mind: physiognomy and the eighteenth-century novel. Edmonton, AB: The Press at Pilot Bay. ISBN 978-0-9681479-0-0.
- McMaster, Juliet; Austen, Jane (2001). Jane Austen's business her world and her profession. Basingstoke: Palgrave. ISBN 978-0-333-62920-8.
- McMaster, Juliet (2004). Reading the body in the eighteenth-century novel. Houndmills, Basingstoke, Hampshire; New York: Palgrave Macmillan. ISBN 978-1-4039-3314-0.
- Alexander, Christine; McMaster, Juliet (2005). The child writer from Austen to Woolf. Cambridge, UK; New York: Cambridge University Press. ISBN 978-0-521-81293-1.
- McMaster, Juliet (2009). That mighty art of black-and-white: Linley Sambourne, Punch and the Royal Academy. Edmonton: Ad Hoc Press. ISBN 978-0-9813838-0-4.
- Alexander, Christine; McMaster, Juliet (2010). The child writer from Austen to Woolf. Cambridge: Cambridge University Press.
- McMaster, Juliet (2017). Jane Austen, Young Author. Routledge. ISBN 978-1-317-11139-9.

== Awards ==
- Royal Society of Canada Fellow, 1980
- Killam Research Fellowship, Canada Council for the Arts, 1987-1989
- F.E.L. Priestley Award for best article in English Studies in Canada, 1989
