= Jim Cotter (composer) =

Australian composer

Clive James Cotter (born 1948 in Geelong, Australia) is an Australian composer currently based in Canberra, Australia. His career has largely been in music for theatre, film, and radio. Cotter began his career as Music Director and resident composer for the Canberra Repertory Theatre and has collaborated extensively with Australian playwright Dorothy Hewett, most notably writing the music for the musical theatre piece The Man From Mukinupin and for the children's play Golden Valley. Cotter also wrote the music for Merlinda Bobis' radio play "Rita's Lullaby", which won the Prix Italia in 1998.

Cotter began his musical career playing trumpet in trad-jazz bands in Melbourne as a teenager. He moved to Canberra in the late 1960s with his family and continued performing in this tradition but gradually drifted towards more modern forms of jazz and rock and roll. He performed with the Canberra bands, The Bitter Lemons, The Firing Squad, Family Portrait, as well as in more experimental collectives with musicians Colin Hoorweg, Dave Kain, Mitch Burns, Christian Wojtowicz and John Tucker.

In the early 1970s, Cotter's increasing interest in contemporary music led him to studies with Larry Sitsky and Don Banks at the Canberra School of Music. An Australia Council Young Composers Fellowship enabled him to discontinue his formal studies and take up the position of music director at Canberra Repertory Society, pursuing a more practical approach to compositional activities with the full support of his mentors. For the next twenty years, Cotter worked as a freelance composer in theatre, film and radio.

In 1992, at the request of Larry Sitsky, he returned to the School of Music, then part of the Australian National University. Since that time, he has been a faculty staff member of the ANU School of Music and is currently the head of composition. His students have included Marian Budos, Michael Sollis, Kate Moore, and Tim Hansen.
