= Kate Lilley =

Australian poet and academic

Kate Lilley (born 1960) is a contemporary Australian poet and academic.

== Early life ==
Kate Lilley was born in Perth, Western Australia in 1960 and moved to Sydney with her family. She is the daughter of writers Dorothy Hewett and Merv Lilley, and sister of Rozanna Lilley, Joe Flood, Michael Flood and Tom Flood. The sisters have claimed that they were sexually assaulted by various men who visited the family home in the 1970s.

She published her first poem at the age of 14, and the following year in 1977 she won the Artlook-Shell Award, against a field of 500 entrants.

After studying at the University of Sydney, Lilley completed a PhD at University of London on masculine elegy, and from 1986 to 1989 was a postdoctoral Research Fellow at St Hilda's College, Oxford working on Seventeenth Century Women's Writing.

== Career ==
Lilley is a scholar of queer, feminist textual theory and history, from 17th century women's writing to contemporary poetry and poetics. She edited The Blazing World by Margaret Cavendish (Penguin Classics, 1994).

She published Versary, her first volume of poems, in 2002; Ladylike in 2012; and Tilt in 2018. In 2010 she edited Selected Poems of Dorothy Hewett for UWA Press.

Lilley had a 'featured cameo' as Vera Newby in the film The Chant of Jimmie Blacksmith.

She has been an associate professor in the Department of English at the University of Sydney, where she directed the Creative Writing program from 2013 to 2021. She is now a 'poet-scholar at large' and a poetry editor of the journal Southerly.

== Awards and recognition ==
Year	Work	Award	Category	Result
1977	Kate Lilley	Artlook-Shell Award		Won
1982	Kate Lilley	University of Sydney	Henry Lawson Prize	Won
2010	Selected Poems of Dorothy Hewett Crawley	Western Australian Premier's Book Awards	Poetry	Shortlisted
2013	Ladylike	New South Wales Premier's Literary Awards	Kenneth Slessor Prize for Poetry	Shortlisted
2019	Tilt	Victorian Premier's Literary Awards	Prize for Poetry	Won

== Works ==
=== Poetry ===
- Versary. (Salt, 2002)
- Round Vienna. (Vagabond Press, 2011)
- Ladylike. (UWA Publishing, 2012)
- Tilt. (Vagabond, 2018)

=== Edited ===
- Margaret Cavendish The Blazing World and Other Writings. (Penguin, 1994)
- Dorothy Hewett Selected Poems. (UWA Press, 2010)
