= Juvenilia Press =

- Industry: Research and Publishing
- Founded: 1994
- Founder: Juliet McMaster
- Headquarters: University of New South Wales, Sydney, Australia
- Area served: International
- Key people: Christine Alexander (Director and General Editor, since 2002)
- Products: Books
- Website: sam2.arts.unsw.edu.au/juvenilia

Juvenilia Press is an international non-profit research and pedagogic press based in the School of Arts and Media at the University of New South Wales. The press undertakes to provide undergraduate and post-graduate students with hands-on experience of textual transmission under the guidance of an academic supervisor. The scholarly volumes published by the press are works from the genre of literary juvenilia – the early works of known writers – and are printed in a format that includes a preface, introduction, note on the text, end notes, textual and contextual appendices, and illustrations.

== History ==
Juvenilia Press was founded in 1994 by Professor Emerita Juliet McMaster, a distinguished 19th-century literary scholar, at the University of Alberta. Starting as a classroom enterprise, McMaster and her students produced a saddle-stitched pamphlet edition of Jane Austen's Jack and Alice, a story Austen wrote at about age thirteen. From this simple start, an offer to edit a previously unpublished early writing of Lady Mary Wortley Montagu transformed the classroom exercise into a working press. In 2002, the Juvenilia Press moved to the University of New South Wales, where it has remained under the general editorship of Emeritus Scientia Professor Christine Alexander, who was on the Juvenilia Press board from its inception.

== Current general editor ==
Christine Alexander is an eminent 19th-century scholar with expertise in Romanticism and Victorian literature, textual transmission and critical editing, juvenilia, the Brontë family and Jane Austen. Alexander's discovery and critical editing of over 100 unpublished manuscripts and a similar number of visual art works pioneered research in two major areas of Brontë studies. Her groundbreaking study of The Early Writings of Charlotte Brontë (Basil Blackwell, 1984) won the prestigious British Academy Rose Mary Crawshay Prize; her major three-volume scholarly Edition of the Early Writings of Charlotte Brontë (Basil Blackwell, 1987, 1991) opened new horizons in Brontë studies; her co-authored The Art of the Brontës (Cambridge University Press, 1995) was the first visual arts book in the field; and she has co-authored The Oxford Companion to the Brontës (Oxford University Press, 2001; paperback 2006; anniversary edition 2018). Alexander was an ARC Senior Research Fellow from 1993 to 1998, was awarded a Commonwealth of Australia Centenary Medal for Service to Australian Society and the Humanities in the Study of English Literature in 2003, and was appointed a Scientia Professor of The University of New South Wales in 2007. She is a fellow of the Australian Academy of the Humanities and a fellow of the Royal Society of New South Wales.

== Pedagogy and the publication process ==
Pedagogy is at the heart of the Juvenilia Press. Each volume, edited by established scholars and their students, includes an introduction about the author, placing their early writings in relation to their adult works. A note on the text discusses the nature of the original manuscript and any technical irregularities associated with young authorship, idiosyncrasies in spelling or punctuation. Students consider textual criticism and actively observe the impact of the practical application of their editing approach to the manuscripts they are working with. Since the students must collective agree on their editorial policy, the often-heated debate that occurs as a result of these considerations forms an integral part of this pedagogical exercise. Other inclusions within a volume are the textual and contextual annotations. Textual annotations form part of the apparatus of the editorial policy and serve to allow the reader to map the changes made to the original copy-text. Contextual annotations are crucial to the research exercise and students are encouraged to err on the side of generosity; in particular they allow us to observe social, cultural and political influences on the young author. Thus, valuable documentary evidence including books and magazines the young author may have read, an awareness of political and social change, aesthetic and personal experience and other historical and geographical detail emerges. Finally, the volumes include illustrations, both photographic and originals, that provide an opportunity for student artist and designers to contribute to the volumes; and several publications of unpublished manuscripts have allowed students in the fields of media and the performing arts (drama, dance and music) to showcase their talents in premier performances.

== Recent editions ==
The following editions of juvenilia have been published by the Juvenilia Press in 2024 and 2025: Selected Early Works by Elizabeth Barrett Browning (edited by Beverly Taylor, with students at the University of North Carolina, Chapel Hill). Long before she wrote her renowned poem "How do I love thee? Let me count the ways", EBB had resolved to be a poet; and she became one of the most influential Victorian poets, known for her celebrated Sonnets from the Portuguese (1850). This selection of works––written between ages six and fourteen––reveals her precocious engagement with issues of gender, education, politics, travel, and religion.

Edgar and Emma and Amelia Webster by Jane Austen (edited by Juliet McMaster with students at the University of Alberta). In these two slender tales Austen deftly satirises the fashionable novel of sensibility and the epistolary convention, and also sends up the courtship and match-making activities that were to be the staple of her novels. This edition was sponsored by the organisers of the Jane Austen Society of North America for their 2024 AGM Conference in Cleveland.

Early Writings from Dumfries by J.M. Barrie (edited by Pamela Nutt with students from Presbyterian Ladies' College Sydney). Best remembered as the creator of Peter Pan, Barrie spent his teenage years at Dumfries Academy, playing with language and composing poetry, satires, and a melodrama with and for schoolfriends, the latter performed with some notoriety in the local theatre. These works reveal his early artistic talent and ambition––he was already writing to experiment and entertain in his game of literature.
