= The Man from Mukinupin =

1979 play by Dorothy Hewett

- Written by: Dorothy Hewett
- Characters: Jack Tuesday/Harry Tuesday; Polly Perkins/Lily Perkins; Eek Perkins/Zeke Perkins; Edie Perkins; Clarry Hummer/The Widow Tuesday; Clemmy Hummer; Cecil Brunner/Max Montebello/The Flasher; Mercy Montebello
- Genre: Musical romantic comedy
- Setting: Wheatbelt town

Premiere
- Date: 1979

The Man from Mukinupin is a musical play by Dorothy Hewett. It was commissioned in 1978 to mark Western Australia's sesquicentenary, and is her most popular and successful play. It is a romantic comedy in two acts covering the periods 1912 to 1914 and 1918 to 1920. The play involves the principles of celebration and reconciliation, providing a "rich theatrical experience with song, dance, humour, and powerful incident."

== Setting ==
Mukinupin is a mythical Western Australia wheat belt town. Downstage left is Perkins' General Store with a counter and stools. Centre stage is a pillared facade of the Mukinupin Town Hall. In the second act, the portico is inscribed "Lest we Forget".

== Characters ==
The play centres around three pairs of doubled (dual role) identical twins, and the Hummer sisters. Each pair divides between Light and Dark. The Light characters are the seemingly respectable and conventional daytime society of Mukinupin, while the Dark characters roam the nighttime netherworld.

Eek Perkins owns the town's General Store, lends money and is a lay preacher. His twin brother Zeek is a water diviner and star gazer. Eek's wife Edie Perkins is a deaf old lady who recites snatches of Victorian poetry. Their daughter Polly Perkins is a Pollyanna type who is courted both by the youthful store assistant Jack Tuesday and the middle-aged travelling salesman Cecil Brunner.

Polly's half-sister Lily Perkins (Touch of the Tar) is the last surviving member of the town's Indigenous community. Lily is the "town slut", but is in love with Jack's brother Harry Tuesday, who has been jailed for stealing a sheep.

Clarry Hummer is an ex-wardrobe mistress for J.C. Williamsons, and is now the town dressmaker. Her sister Clemmy Hummer, an ex-tightrope walker from Wirth's Circus, is Master of Ceremonies for the Night People.

Max Montebello, an Italian actor/manager, and his wife Mercy Montebello, an ageing Shakespearean actress, are two more Light characters. The paired grotesque Dark characters are The Flasher, town flasher and madman, who talks to Marconi on his radio, and The Widow Tuesday, mother of Jack and Harry. Cecil, Max and the Flasher are doubled, as are Clarry Hummer and the Widow Tuesday.

== Synopsis ==
The action takes place between 1912 and 1920. The Day scenes are set in the town, while the dreamlike Night scenes take place in the nearby gully and creekbed.

Act I (1912–14) begins with an eerie Night scene, as all the Dark characters do a rustic Morris clog dance. Polly is courted by both Jack and Cecil, with Cecil preferred by her parents. The Great War begins. The travelling vaudeville couple, the Montebellos, arrive in town to deliver the "Strangling of Desdemona". Jack is excited during the performance, leaps onto stage to rescue Desdemona, and then delivers a rousing music hall song, which impresses all present. Jack enlists.

A bereft Polly wanders into the dark and is haunted by the Night people. Jack is also there drunk. He is approached by 'Touch of Tar' and goes to the creek bed with her. The town's dark secret is revealed by Clarry, Clemmy and Zeek. Years ago, Eek led a massacre of Aborigines camped in the creek bed, urged on by the Mukinupin wives, jealous of the men's frequent visits to the women. Harry Tuesday also goes to war, singing "The New Holland Song" about the rape of the country.

Act II begins as the Armistice is declared. The troop train pulls into Mukinupin and the townsfolk enact a hero's welcome for Jack. In fact Harry is the hero and has won the Victoria Cross, but he is shell shocked. Their mother Widow Tuesday is dead, and Jack wants to go shearing. Mercy, now also a widow, needs an acting partner and arrives to convince Jack to join her touring. Jack asks Polly to come with them, but an argument ensues. Cecil moves in on Polly. Lily tries to get Jack to sleep with her again, so he dresses her up in respectable clothing and Jack, Mercy and Lily depart for a theatrical tour.

Polly and Cecil dance and their marriage is agreed. Lily returns bedraggled after only a week, declaring she loves Harry. She decides to drown herself in the creek, but Harry and Zeek rescue her. Harry and Lily declare their love and Zeek marries them before the Night people, to words from "The Tempest". Zeek seeks the water of life to revive the desert. Harry and Lily head out over the salt lakes.

Polly is dressed for a sad wedding to Cecil, but Jack arrives and intervenes. He has found a vaudeville job with J.C. Williamsons, and Polly's parents reconsider his suit. Mercy moves on Cecil, and Eek celebrates a double wedding. Mercy and Cecil open a fish and chip shop. The finale, "The Mukinupin Carousel", is reconciliatory in mood.

== Themes ==
Although seemingly a light story of romance between two related couples, The Man From Mukinupin incorporates darker themes: the treatment and marginalisation of Aboriginal people; the impact of the Great War on Australian country towns, and the problems of a barely habitable environment degraded by salination due to over-farming.

The characters are evenly split between Day and Night. None of the Daytime characters have any rapport with the land and resent being brought to the town. Hopkins (1987) sees the play as a "profound split between culture and landscape", where the Day people are exploitative, guilt-ridden and alienated from the land into which they have imported a foreign culture, while the Night people have found ways to adapt to the landscape.

The play is loaded with literary allusions, so that "high art envelops stringent and articulate social criticism". These range from pagan fertility chants, a Lay of Ancient Rome, Tudor Epithalamiums, snippets of four Shakespeare plays, rewrites of traditional Australian folk songs, short recitations from Browning, Tennyson, Longfellow, Mary Gilmore and Henry Lawson, and excerpts from the more moralistic Victorian poets.

Eek and Zeek, names of the two brothers that epitomise the Day-Night dichotomy, were humorous nicknames for Ephraim and Ezekiel Hewett, Hewett's grandfather and his uncle. Hewett has stated, however, that the thematic struggle mostly lies within the ambit of the women characters. "They are the most aware of the predicament and are the most violently affected by it".

== Music ==
The original music was composed by Jim Cotter, ironically written while waiting for the birth of his own twins.

The music is in the style of the 1910s to 1920s, including old English folk and nursery songs, vaudeville and bush music. The songs are: "The Five Man’s Morris", "Polly Put the Kettle on", "Summer Bird", "Willow", "An ‘Am an Egg and an Onion", "Have Another Acid Drop", "Your Country Needs You in the Trenches", "Harry Tuesday’s Song", "New Holland Song", "Polly’s Sad Song", "Touch of the Tar’s Song", "Polly’s Sad Wedding Song", "Mercy and Jack’s Duet", "The Wedding Dance", and "The Mukinupin Carousel".

The 1981 Melbourne Theatre Company production at the Russell Street Theatre had alternative music written by Elizabeth Riddle.

== Reception and criticism ==
The commission of Hewett to write a sesquicentennial contribution was met by public dismay in Western Australia, in part due to a campaign against her by her former husband Lloyd Davies and his wife. However, according to director Barry, the spirit of celebration in the play won over the doubters.

Hewett's work, even more than other playwrights, requires strong and sympathetic casting and direction, and this is particularly the case for The Man from Mukinupin. The Opera House production in 1981 broke box office records. The Belvoir Street production in 2009 also received excellent reviews, as did a student production in Newcastle in 2014, while the 1981 MTC production fell rather flat.

The environmental and Indigenous issues explored in the play have continued to resonate with contemporary Australian audiences.

== Resources ==
Oxford Reference. Man from Mukinupin

Lekkie Hopkins (1987) Language, Culture and Landscape in "The Man From Mukinupin Australasian Drama Studies 10.

Rebecca Clode (2014). Critical Celebrations. Chapter 1: The Man from Mukinupin. PhD Thesis, ANU.
