= The Chapel Perilous =

1971 play by Dorothy Hewett

- Written by: Dorothy Hewett
- Characters: Sally Banner; Michael; The Headmistress/The Mother; The Canon/The Father/Thomas; Sister Rosa/Judith/David/Saul; Chorus
- Genre: Expressionist
- Setting: School chapel

Premiere
- Date: 1971

The Chapel Perilous, Dorothy Hewett's third full-length play, was written in 1970. The play is Expressionist in style, where the theatrical spectacle dominates the plot. It introduces Sally Banner, a picaresque heroine moving without success through a search for love and freedom, while oppressed by authority figures and disappointed by unsatisfactory lovers. She is, in brief succession, a defiant schoolgirl, a promiscuous wartime student, a Communist, a suburban de facto, and a well-known poet. It is recognised as Hewett's best play.

== Characters ==
The eleven principal characters are played by five actors. They are

- Sally Banner: A poet, aged 16 to 61, rebellious and self-absorbed
- Michael: Her lover, aged 17 to 40s. Rough, demanding and cruel
- Authority Figure I:
  - "The Headmistress": an Englishwoman with intellect and dignity
  - “The Mother”: ages from middle-age to senility. Neurotic and overbearing
- Authority Figure II:
  - “The Canon”: ageing, weak and hypocritical
  - “The Father”: middle-aged and sad
  - Thomas: aged 20s to 40s, Sally's husband, idealistic and gullible
- Authority Figure III:
  - Sister Rosa: senior member of an Anglican teaching order, implacable and authoritarian
  - Judith: schoolgirl and later a teaching nun, sardonic, cold and Lesbian
  - David: aged 20s to 40s, Sally's lover, intellectual
  - Saul: 30s, Sally's lover, a leader of the Communist Party of Australia

There are also

- incidental characters: mostly comic
- Chorus: singers and dancers: schoolgirls, students, protesters from the 1940s to the 1970s

== Setting ==
Upstage the outline of a school chapel with a stained glass window. The tower is accessible.

Three rostrums and an altar on a platform. Large masks or statues of the Headmistress, the Canon and Sister Rosa are on each rostrum. They are large enough to hide an actor. These are the authority figures and judges. Sometimes they step from behind the masks and become other characters.

== Synopsis ==
Throughout the play, the dialogue is rapidly, almost inconsequentially exchanged between characters who each have a different world view, while the loudspeakers announce events or secret thoughts, and the Chorus sings and dances. The many songs of Sally and the Chorus, and Sally's introspective poems, play an integral role in the script.

=== Prologue ===
A clap of thunder. Sally describes her approach to the Chapel Perilous through a blackened land of burning forests. The Headmistress unveils a stained glass window in the school chapel, endowed by the older Sally. The Canon and Sister Rosa emerge from behind their masks to extol Sally's fame, with asides as to their real attitudes to Sally, Satirical dialogue comes from the loudspeakers, while the schoolgirl Chorus sings “Poor Sally”, “Jerusalem” and “Come live with me and be my love”. Sister Rosa tries to make the young Sally bow before the altar.

Sister Rosa is transformed into the schoolgirl Judith. Sally lyrically says she loves Judith, who cannot reciprocate. The Headmistress warns Judith that Sally is gifted but precocious and evil. Judith rejects Sally. In despair, Sally climbs the tower to jump, but instead throws down her hat.

Sally sits with the Parents while the loudspeaker announces the outbreak of war. The Mother reads Sally's erotic verse aloud and calls her a dirty little whore. Sally meets a Catholic violin player who feels her breasts. The Parents take her to a magistrate and she is put on probation. She meets Michael on a bicycle. The Father hits Michael on the head with a piece of timber. Sally and Michael have sex without love. Judith calls Sally an "awful little whore".

Sally receives the gold medal for English while the Chorus sings “Bring me my bow” and chants, “With time” repeatedly.

Act I

The Chorus jitterbug in 1940s outfits. An interviewer talks to parents about Sally's poetry prizes. The Father says he doesn't understand poetry, and Sally is man-mad. Sally says the world tastes like blood in her mouth. She is taken to an unimpressed psychiatrist. The Mother says she smelled semen on Sally's pants. After a fight she leaves home.

David finds her asleep in the Men's Common Room and falls in love. He wants to love her intellect, and takes her home, Girl students say Sally is a nympho. David goes off to war, saying he can't take their intellectual romance with her lovers on the side. Sally says she'll marry David and wants to make love. He walks off awkwardly. Sally yells he's a rotten impotent shit.

Sally yells she's Sally Banner and nobody, and swallows Lysol. The Parents try to revive her. In hospital, Sally's national ABC prize win is announced. Her father dies, and the Mother cries, "You've killed our Daddy." The actors all repeat earlier lines of blame at Sally.

Thomas arrives in uniform carrying a bunch of dandelions. He instructs her in Communism, and marries her. Thomas becomes drunk because he can't consummate the marriage. The Authority figures pray.

Michael returns, surprised she would marry anyone but him. They drink and go to the beach, A passing figure writes ETERNITY in chalk. Sally tells Michael she's pregnant. He says she's on her own.

Thomas comes home from war, and Sally tells him she has aborted Michael's baby. He forgives her, says they have socialism to build. The Chorus sings “The Worker's Flag” and they all march off.

Act II

A fairground sideshow proceeds, Sally is behind a political rostrum, speaking for the Soviet Union, backed by Party leader Saul and interrupted by sideshow spruikers and interjectors. The Mother enters as a widow, and says Sally is a dirty Commo and won't get any money.

Thomas enters pushing a baby carriage, and says Saul is inspiring. David turns up drunk, wanting mothering. Incidental characters say Sally has "gone off", or ask would she "like a bit". Michael enters and says "Choose!" while Thomas and Saul stand in judgement.

Sally tells Thomas about the affair with Saul, leaving him “with nothing” but the baby. The Mother offers Michael cash to "take off". The baby dies of leukemia.

“Overtime rock” is sung by the Chorus. Michael is tired, but Sally wants to make love. The Chorus sings “Marry me Sally” and “Come live with me”, while Michael burns her papers and poems.

A court scene takes place, based on the Petrov trial. Sally is accused by witnesses in turn: the Mother, the Father, Thomas, Saul, Judith, and Michael. Judith accuses her of destroying her children for a great love – of herself, and to write.

The amplifier intermittently announces events showing the passage of time.

- Martin Luther King is dead (1968), David appears after sex, having finally consummated his affair with Sally. He is married and can't stay despite Sally's pleading.
- Czechoslovakia has been invaded (1968). Sally comes home to the Mother, who is in a wheelchair.
- Ho Chi Minh is dead (1969). Judith is now a nun.

A bell tolls and they all line up. Sally bows or nods to the altar. She stands outlined on the tower, with the Authority figures below her in red light.

== Music ==
The original music was composed by Frank Arndt, who had taught piano to the young David Helfgott. The highlight songs are the satirical “Poor Sally” theme, Hewett's rewrite of Andrew Marvel's “Come live with me and be my love”, the wistful "I passed my love”, the boisterous “Sally go round the moon” and the bawdy “Lets all dance the polka”. Several songs from folk musician Mike Leyden are included, as well as Les Flood's “Overtime Staggers Rock” (which also featured in Hewett's early novel Bobbin Up).

== First performance ==
- January 1971.The Chapel Perilous. Graduate Dramatic Society, New Fortune Theatre, Perth. Director Arne Neeme. Cast: Helen Macdonald Neeme as Sally Banner, Margaret Ford as Headmistress, Colin Nugent as Michael, Brian Blaine as the Canon, Victor Marsh as Sister Rosa

For reasons of theatrical setting and direction, Hewett preferred this first production over all later ones.

The Chapel Perilous was written for the New Fortune Theatre, which Hewett's university office overlooked. It made full use of its pit stage and three-tier construction. The open stage allowed the characters and the Chorus to move fluidly around and across each other. The Authority Figure plaster masks were a full two stories tall, giving a giant brooding presence and a gravitas to proceedings, particularly the court judgement scene. On the third tier, Sally was able to rise above these monstrous statues in the finale.

The director Aarne Neeme was an ex-dancer and skilled in directing the movements of the two Chorus troupes. Neeme wrote an insightful introduction to the published version of the play, covering key dimensions that were often neglected in later performances.

The original hero was named "Sally Thunder” and the performance was advertised as such. Preparations were interrupted when a female journalist of that name complained the lurid character was not to her liking, and an alternate name “Sally Banner” was adopted. Immediately, a couple called Banner complained that their four-month-old baby girl had been given the nickname “Sally” and the play might blight her future life-chances, but they withdrew their complaint.

== Influences and style ==
The Chapel Perilous had its genesis in an old notebook which Hewett's son Joe Flood found in a garage: Hewett's diary at age sixteen. She was intrigued by the passionate outpourings of her teenage self and decided to turn them into a work of some kind.

The play that resulted is Expressionist. At the time of the first staging of The Chapel Perilous, this genre was over 60 years old in Germany but largely unknown in Australia. In Expressionism, the full performance rather than the flow of dialogue delivers the meaning. An overlooked failure of the societal system usually underpins the action. The protagonist is typically the “New Man”, unafraid to act on their moral beliefs. A later development is Brecht's Epic Theatre, where the music distances the audience from the action, and sympathy for the characters is discouraged. Hewett's play incorporates all these features. It is also influenced by Elizabethan theatre, and owes a debt to Elliot's The Waste Land.

Nobel laureate Patrick White observed, “For all its incidental but relevant crudity a very subtle and thoughtful play, with an introspective theme brilliantly externalised as theatre by the author and director. A work of art universal in its appeal as the crushing weight of authority in all its forms on the creative personality. A major statement of the woman artist's quest for freedom and self realisation in a community uncertain of its standards.”

Observers have sought to define the three Authority figures (the three Masks with their attendant actor) in different ways. Neeme found the "Mother" class of characters as “the born great”, the "Rosa" class as the opportunists who “seek greatness, while the "Canon" class are the hapless or corrupt who “have greatness thrust upon them”. Alternately, Whitehead saw a dichotomy of sterility versus authority in the placement of the Authority figures.

Analysts of the play have discussed how the play moves between many styles in a manner that can be challenging to unprepared audiences, and which some professional theatre companies have found difficult to stage. It incorporated “shouts and whispers, songs and chants, choruses and solos, echoes and amplification …and always an attention to rhythm.” It is “an acoustic patchwork of heightened meaning” which has been “assured of a prominent place in the history of recent Australian drama because it employs almost every technique that seemed new and experimental in the late sixties and early seventies, and ranges widely in its moods from the burlesque historical through the social satirical to the purely lyrical.”

== Sally Banner ==
Where the play parted company with Epic Theatre was that many women in the audience identified or sympathised with Sally Banner. Sally is to a fair extent a caricature; humourless, immature and hopelessly demanding what others are not prepared to give. Yet this "incandescent heroine with the element of quest in her sexuality” arrived at exactly the right time.

For many young women, Sally was the first modern liberated woman in literature at a time when women were distancing from the attitudes of their parents and seeking new role models. Sally, "wearing her hair as armour" in a female form of chivalric heroism, and proclaiming “the blood and flesh are wiser than the intellect”, captured the Zeitgeist of 1971 and launched a new "mythology of the feminine" in this "founding text" of Australian feminist drama.

Sally Banner paradoxically led to Hewett's fame, at least in Australia. A National Times headline in 1972 declared, "For women, a work that will make things suddenly and blindingly clear", celebrating a play that "will put up Hewett's name in lights along with Greer."

Hewett's own attitude toward Sally could be dismissive: unsurprising given that the play spends much of its energy lampooning her. Hewett regarded her as a “humbling and irritating doppelganger” who would continue to follow her around forever. Ultimately however she was possessive of "her Sally", as an immature part of herself.

=== Controversy ===
Sally has a tentative lesbian affair, undergoes an abortion, and leaves her husband and child to go off with another man. She has the temerity to ask several men to make love to her, though they cannot comply. At the time, all this was shocking to conservative audiences, and still might raise an eyebrow today. When the play was published in 1972, some education authorities sent a warning message to schools and parents concerning the text. Ten years later, however, The Chapel Perilous was on secondary school syllabuses.

The end of the play, where in the published version Sally gives a nod as a gesture before her donated stained-glass window is lit, might simply indicate that to obtain recognition by those in power you must at least concede they exist. However, feminists for whom the play was "not radical enough" (such as Anne Summers and Carole Ferrier) took this nod to authority as a clear signal that Sally had capitulated and was not a feminist figure.

== Adaptations ==
- 20 January 1976, Radio play, BBC, The New Australian Plays 5.

== Publication ==
- Dorothy Hewett (1972). The Chapel Perilous. Currency Press. Reprinted 1985, 2007, 2017.
- Dorothy Hewett (1981), Collected Plays Volume 1. Currency Press. Elizabeth Schafer (ed) (1997). Australian Women's Drama: Texts and Feminisms. Currency Press.

== Resources ==
- The Chapel Perilous – A Reading Australia Information Trail.
- Joanne Tompkins (1992). Setting the Stage. PhD Thesis, York University Ontario.
- Jasna Novakovic (2006). “Dorothy Hewett: The Place of Myth and the Influence of the Avantgarde in her Plays”, PhD Thesis.
- Susan Chaundy and Aubrey Mellor (2009). Dorothy Hewett and the Chapel Perilous.
- Susan Sheridan (2009). Dorothy Hewett's paths to the Chapel Perilous. Westerly 54, pp. 170–88
- Julian Meyrick (2017). The great Australian plays: sex, poetry and the Chapel Perilous. The Conversation. May 3
