= H. G. Kippax =

Australian print journalist

Harold ("Harry") Gemmell Kippax AO, better known as H. G. Kippax (6 October 1920 – 12 August 1999) was an Australian print journalist. He was known as a foreign correspondent, war correspondent and theatre and music critic for The Sydney Morning Herald for over four decades (1945–89). He was also a leader writer. Between 1958 and 1983 he produced 3,456 editorials for the Herald. Kippax also wrote for the independent fortnightly journal Nation 1958–66, under the pseudonym Brek.

== Career ==
Kippax was born in Sydney in 1920. He failed to complete an Arts degree at the University of Sydney and became a cadet journalist with The Sydney Morning Herald before the start of World War II. He served overseas in the 2nd AIF in the Signals Corps 1942–45.

On return to Australia, he rejoined the Herald as a war and foreign correspondent, serving in London, Germany, Greece, Spain and Portugal. He was News Editor in Sydney from 1950 to 1954. For the next three years he worked overseas again, reporting from London, France, Russia, and the Middle East, where he covered the 1956 Suez Crisis. He was in Sydney from 1958 for the rest of his career, where he became renowned as a theatre and literary critic while holding more senior editorial roles.

Kippax was an early champion of the plays of Patrick White, being one of the few critics who wrote favourably of The Ham Funeral. Of its 1961 Adelaide premiere, he wrote that the play ... brilliantly suggests a way out of the impasse in which the Australian drama finds itself. After the 1962 Sydney premiere, he wrote: I am not going to mince words or hedge against the future. I believe the professional performance of The Ham Funeral at the Palace ... is an epoch-making event. But he and White fell out over more negative critiques of some later White plays. David Marr writes "he had come to think all White's later plays were trash". They also had diametrically opposing views of the plays of Louis Nowra – what Kippax loved in Nowra, White was sure to hate; and vice versa.

He was said to have "spotted the talent" of the actors John Bell, Robyn Nevin, Mel Gibson and Judy Davis; and the playwright David Williamson.

Harry Kippax was appointed an Officer of the Order of Australia in the Australia Day Honours 1988, for services to the theatre and media. Kippax died in 1999, aged 78.

Selections from his critical writings were edited by Harry Payne Heseltine and published as:

- A Leader of His Craft: Theatre Reviews by H. G. Kippax (2004)
- The Voice of the Thunderer: Journalism of H. G. Kippax (2006).

He was a nephew of the Test cricketer Alan Kippax.
