= Elizabeth Fell =

Australian activist and journalist (1940–2020)

Liz Fell
- Born: Elizabeth Dyneley Fell; 7 March 1940
- Died: 13 August 2020 (aged 80)
- Education: University of Sydney (BA, Psychology)
- Occupations: Journalist, academic, activist

Elizabeth Dyneley Fell, known as Liz Fell, (7 March 1940 – 13 August 2020) was an Australian activist, journalist, academic, feminist and public intellectual, who was a founding member of the prison activist organisations Prisoners Action Group and Women Behind Bars. She was awarded the George Munster Award for Freelance Journalism in 1986 for her radio features on ABC Radio National about government and corporate activity in media and telecommunications.

== Early life and education ==
Fell was the second child of John and Margaret Fell (Grant) and younger sister of Eleanor. She attended Abbotsleigh and Frensham boarding school. She studied a Bachelor of Arts degree at the University of Sydney from 1955 majoring in psychology. In her final year she was awarded the prize for best student. She then worked as a psychology tutor for Professor John Maze and became a member of the intellectual movement based around the University, the Sydney Push.

== Career ==
In 1969, Fell joined the sociology department at the University of NSW where she taught in a range of courses including architecture. In 1971 she was the founder of a controversial sex education publication aimed at students called SEX.

In 1970 she became an active supporter for the Gurindji campaign for Aboriginal self-determination and over many years continued her support for Black Power leaders in Sydney such as her close friend, Aboriginal activist and academic Gary Foley.

Fell worked in television, print and radio as a journalist. She joined the ABC program Lateline in 1974 and also worked for the Nine Network on the Sunday program and 60 Minutes, The National Times and The Sun-Herald, and Dateline on the Special Broadcasting Service (SBS). Elizabeth (Liz) was elected a Distinguished Fellow of the Telecommunication Society of Australia.

== Death ==
Fell taught university students and worked as a freelance journalist until she was 73 and died on 13 August 2020, following a long illness, aged 80.
