= Harry Robertson =

Harry Robertson may refer to:

- Harry J. Robertson (1896–1962), American football player and coach
- Harry Robertson (folk singer) (1923–1995), Australian folk-singer/songwriter, poet and activist
- Harry Robertson (musician) (1932–1996), Scottish musician
- Harry Robertson (painter) (born 1943)
- Harry Robertson (rugby league)
