= Sydney Push =

Australian intellectual sub-culture

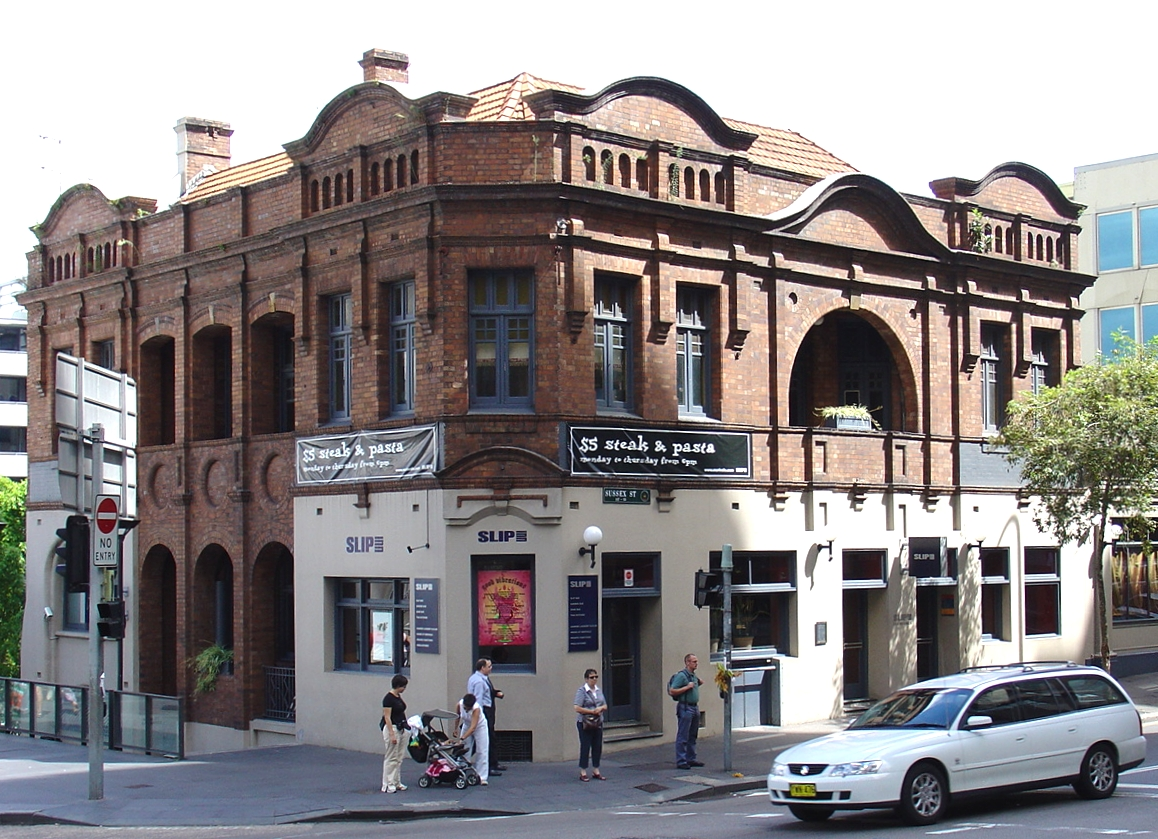
The Royal George Hotel in April 2004. It has been renamed the Slip Inn. The Sydney Push met in the "back room", a little above ground floor, at left.

The Sydney Push was an intellectual subculture in Sydney from the late 1940s to the early 1970s. Its politics were predominantly left-wing libertarianism. The Push operated in a pub culture and included university students, academics, manual workers, musicians, lawyers, criminals, journalists and public servants. Rejection of conventional morality and authoritarianism was a common bond. Students and staff from Sydney University, mainly the Faculty of Arts, were prominent members. In the 1960s, students and staff from the University of New South Wales also became involved.

Well known associates of the Push include Richard Appleton, Jim Baker, Lex Banning, Eva Cox, Robyn Davidson, Margaret Fink, John Flaus, Germaine Greer, Lynne Segal, George Molnar, Robert Hughes, Harry Hooton, Clive James, Barry Humphries, Sasha Soldatow, David Makinson, Jill "Blue" Neville, Paddy McGuinness, Frank Moorhouse, David Perry, Lillian Roxon, Jack the Anarchist, Darcy Waters and Howard and Judy Smith. From 1961 to 1962, poet Les Murray resided in Brian Jenkins's Push household at Glen Street, Milsons Point, which became a mecca for associates visiting Sydney from Melbourne and other cities.

== Academic contributors ==
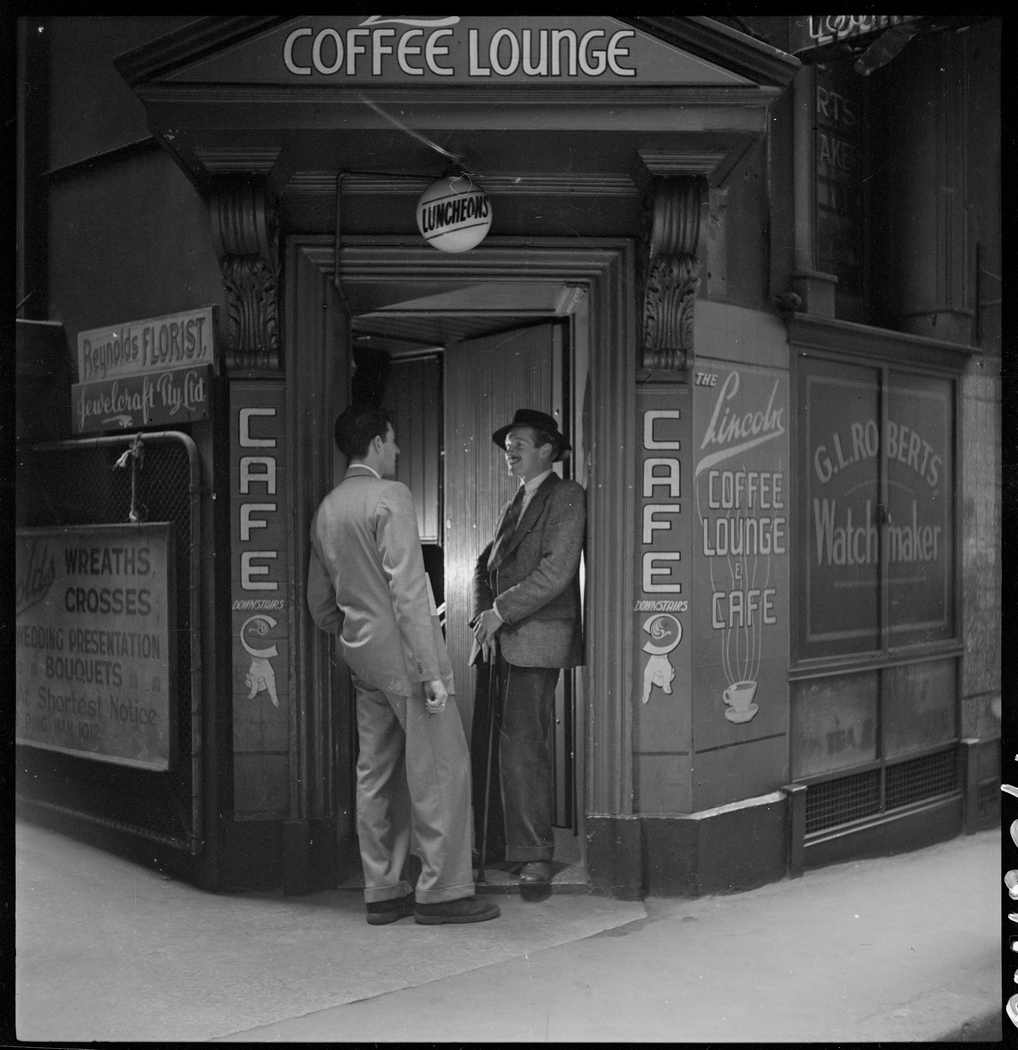
The Lincoln Coffee Lounge, located on Rowe Street, is said to be the birthplace of the "Sydney Push" movement in its early days, just after the war. A popular meeting place for artists & writers, it comprised a mixture of university students, lecturers, bohemians and libertarians.

Amongst the key intellectual figures in Push debates were philosophers David J. Ivison, George Molnar, Roelof Smilde, Darcy Waters and Jim Baker, as recorded in Baker's memoir Sydney Libertarians and the Push, published in the libertarian Broadsheet in 1975. Other active people included psychologists Terry McMullen, John Maze and Geoff Whiteman, educationist David Ferraro, June Wilson, Les Hiatt, Ian Bedford, Ken Maddock and Alan Olding, among many others listed in the article. An understanding of Sydney libertarian values and social theory can be obtained from their publications, a few of which are available online. There are also interesting critical articles in the Arts Society's annual journal Arna by Baker and Molnar whose essay on Zamyatin's We concluded:

... Orwell spins out to its last conclusion the illusion that the fate of freedom depends mainly on the colour of the ruling party. We, precisely because it presents its rebels as apolitical, as individualists if you wish, cuts through this falsehood. Zamyatin's superior social insight, although presented and presumably gained artistically and not by way of scientific analysis, consists first in his firm rejection of the rationality or finality of history and, second, in his recognition that anarchic protest against those in power, not the capture of power, is at the core of freedom.

Hiatt and Nestor Grivas's Helenic Herald published a collection of Sydney libertarian essays as The Sydney Line in 1963.

The conservative side of Australian literary life, prominent among whom were the poets James McAuley and Harold Stewart, spurned the Push as "a self-aggrandising cult of talentless and incoherent decadents and egoists".

== Social and cultural life ==
The intellectual life of the Libertarians was mainly pursued in and around the university, including neighbouring pubs like May's, the Forest Lodge and the British Lion. On evenings and weekends, it overflowed into the much larger 'downtown' social milieu known as the Push, which flourished at a succession of pubs and other places of refreshment including the Tudor, Lincoln, Lorenzini's Wine Bar and Repin's Coffee Shop; however, of greatest notoriety, was the Royal George Hotel in Sussex Street, which Clive James described in his Unreliable Memoirs:

The Royal George was the headquarters of the Downtown Push, usually known as just the Push.... As well as the Libertarians and the aesthetes there were the small-time gamblers, traditional jazz fans and the homosexual radio repair men who had science fiction as a religion. The back room had tables and chairs. If you stuck your head through the door of the back room you came face to face with the Push. The noise, the smoke and the heterogeneity of physiognomy were too much to take in. It looked like a cartoon on which Hogarth, Daumier and George Grosz had all worked simultaneously, fighting for supremacy.

Since the mid-1950s, before extended pub hours replaced 6 o'clock closing, Push night-life commonly consisted of a meal at an inexpensive restaurant such as the Athenian or Hellenic Club ("the Greeks") or La Veneziana ("the Italians") followed by parties held most nights of the week at private residences. These were very lively occasions with singing of folksongs and bawdy ditties such as "Professor John Glaister" and many others, often accompanied by transvestite piano player Herbert Dye. Accompaniments were also provided by accomplished guitarists and lutenists (Ian McDougall, John Earls, Terry Driscoll, Don Ayrton, Brian Mooney, John Roberts, Don Lee, Beth Schurr, Bill Berry, Marian Henderson and others). Don Henderson, Declan Affley and Martyn Wyndham-Read are three well-known artists who were influenced by their time in the Push.

== Protest and activism ==
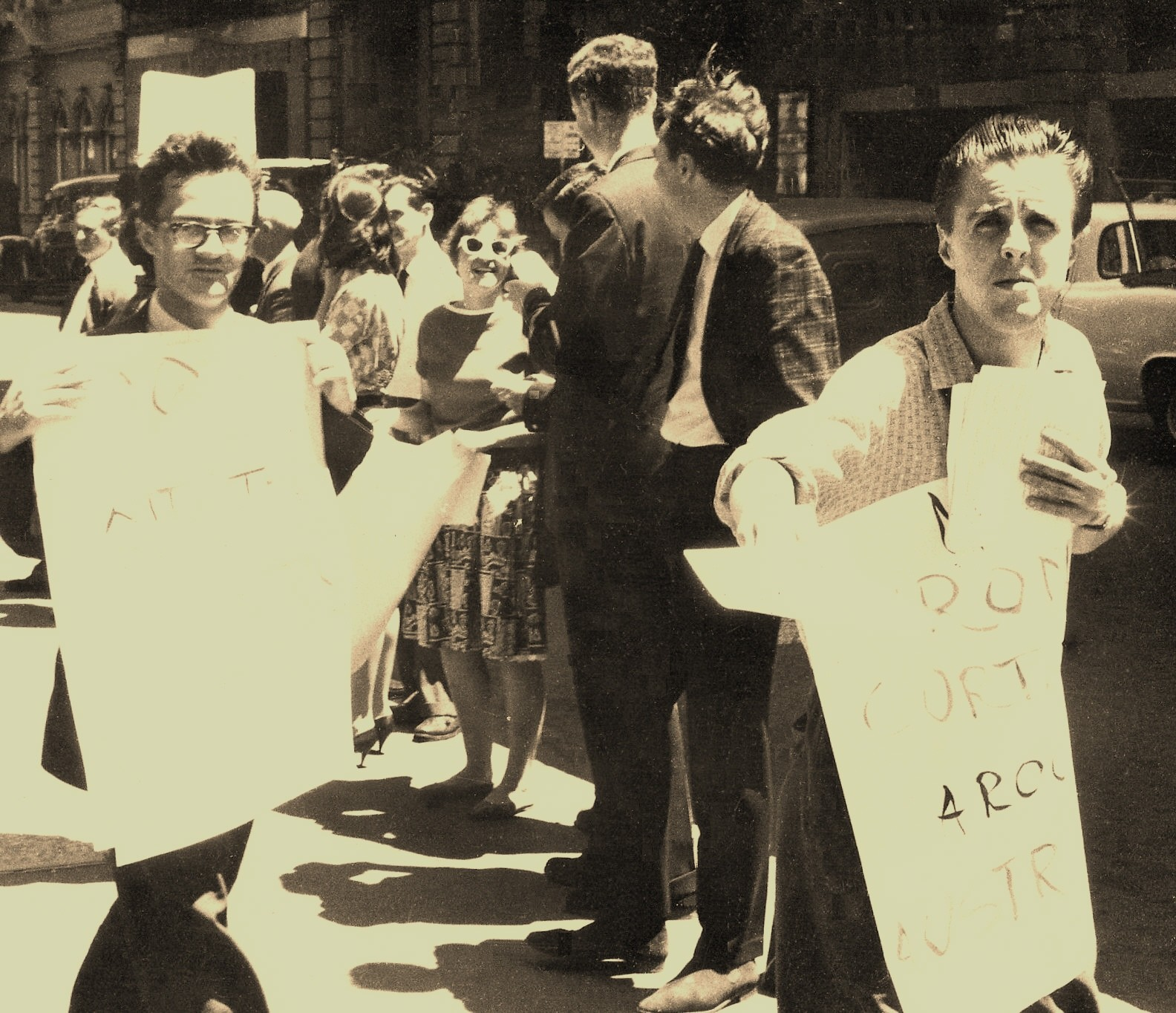
Sydney Push associates Ian Parker (left) and Bob Gould in a 1960s pavement demonstration outside the Queen Victoria Building in Sydney. Parker died in the late 1970s; Gould, a notable bookseller, died in 2011.

Sydney Libertarianism adopted an attitude of permanent protest recognisable in the sociological theories of Max Nomad, Vilfredo Pareto and Robert Michels, which predicted the inevitability of elites and the futility of revolutions. They used phrases such as "anarchism without ends", "non-utopian anarchism", and "permanent protest" to describe their activities and theories. Others labelled them as the 'futilitarians'. An early Marx quotation, used by Wilhelm Reich as the motto for his The Sexual Revolution, was adopted as a motto, viz:

Since it is not for us to create a plan for the future that will hold for all time, all the more surely what we contemporaries have to do is the uncompromising critical evaluation of all that exists, uncompromising in the sense that our criticism fears neither its own results nor the conflict with the powers that be.

Nevertheless, Push associates regularly assisted in organising and turning out for street demonstrations, e.g., against South African apartheid and in support of victims of the 1960 Sharpeville massacre; against the initial refusal of immigration minister Alexander Downer, Sr. to grant political asylum to three Portuguese merchant seamen who jumped ship in Darwin; and against Australia's participation in the Vietnam War.

In line with the Libertarians' rejection of conventional political models, electoral activism was foreign to the Push, save to urge non-voting and informal voting. At the election after prime minister Harold Holt failed to return from a swim, artist and film-maker David Perry produced a highly acclaimed poster featuring "a continuum of pigs (inspired by Orwell's Animal Farm)" with the slogan "Whoever you vote for, a politician always gets in."

== Events in the news ==
The most dramatic public event to impinge on the Push was the mysterious Bogle-Chandler case of 1963 and its sequel, a heavily publicised inquest in which several Push personalities gave evidence. Another memorable incident involved the discovery of what news media recognised as a dismembered murder victim in an unlocked trunk at the foot of a city train-station escalator. This was later revealed to be a collection of body parts, the property of a doctor, found and used in a macabre practical joke by a notorious confidence trickster, the late Julian Ashleigh Sellors (known in the Push as 'Flash Ash').

== Dispersal after 1964 ==
The year 1964 saw the gradual demise of the Royal George Hotel as the prime focal venue of the Sydney Push which dispersed its bustling social life to other traditional venues like the Newcastle, Orient and Port Jackson hotels in The Rocks near Circular Quay and the Rose, Crown and Thistle at Paddington, New South Wales, but also to alternative central-city pubs including the United States and Edinburgh Castle. By the early 1970s, the Criterion Hotel on the corner of Liverpool and Sussex Streets had become the watering hole of the last of the Push diehards. Meanwhile, Push hangers-on and 'tourists', now numbering hundreds, patronised pubs like the Four-in-Hand (Paddington) and the Forth and Clyde at Balmain, but these were venues of social entertainment, lacking the intellectual camaraderie, the informal folksong and the bohemian flavour of the 'George'.

The retired education professor Alan Barcan has published a personal account of his view of activism at Sydney University during the 1960s. Though he was not an eyewitness of Push life, he provides some relevant insights into how student life became infected by Push doctrines of freedom and rebellion, to a point at which the social movement was superseded and its leading personalities were dispersed or replaced with a new breed of social critics. As described by Barcan, this period saw the emergence of mainstream talents like poets Les Murray and Geoffrey Lehmann, journalists David Solomon, Mungo MacCallum (Jnr) and Laurie Oakes, Oz magazine satirists Richard Neville, Richard Walsh and Martin Sharp, and maverick writer Bob Ellis. These were people who did not actively embrace the Push life but were strongly influenced by it.

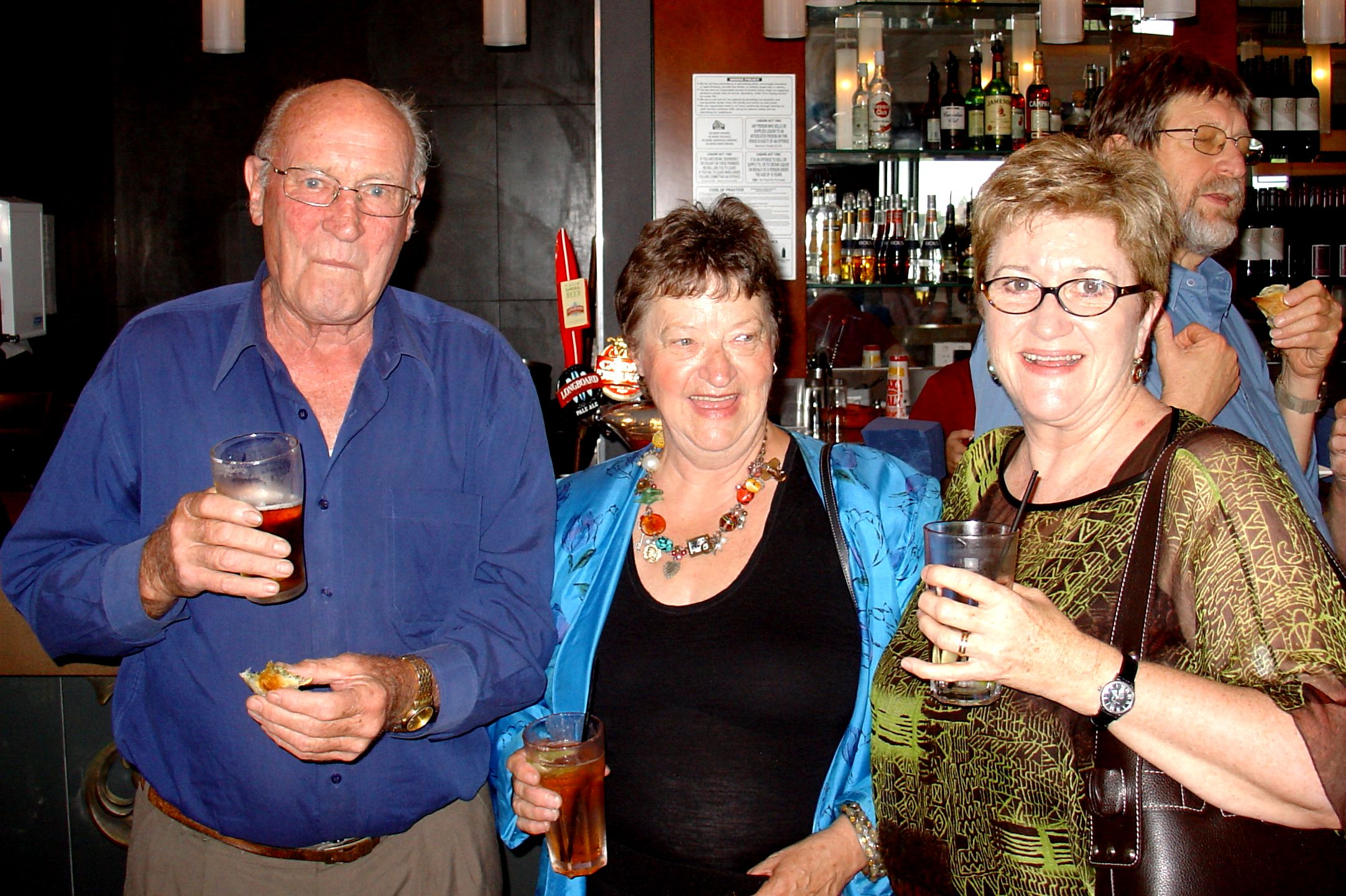
A group of Push associates at a reunion in 2012

Push personalities who emigrated to the United Kingdom included Clive James, Paddy McGuinness, Chester (Philip Graham) and Ian Parker (pictured above) who returned to Sydney in the late 1970s and was knocked down and killed while drunk, in Dixon Street. For some reason, a false account was promulgated that he died in a London street. Paddy McGuinness returned to Australia in 1971, working as a film critic, Labor ministerial staffer, right-wing newspaper columnist and journal editor until his death in 2007. Folksinger John Earls went to Bolivia and former Tribune (Communist Party of Australia newspaper) cartoonist Harry Reade went to join Fidel Castro's revolution in Cuba (and returned in 1971 at the same time as Paddy McGuinness). The disabled poet Lex Banning travelled to England and Greece from 1962 until 1964 but returned and died in Sydney in 1965. The folksinger Don Ayrton departed to settle at Kuranda in Queensland where he committed suicide in 1982. A tragedy occurred as Paddy McGuinness was departing for Italy by ship in May 1963. The farewelling crowd included a young Push lady, Janne (or Jan) Millar, who fell to the concrete dock floor from a height and suffered fatal head injuries. A number of other tragic deaths occurred in this decade, including some from substance abuse which was becoming a regular part of Sydney culture at the time.

Many young Push associates simply moved on to careers in the professions and academia. A reunion organised by André Frankovits at the Royal George/Slip Inn in 2000 attracted around 280. Another, at the Harold Park Hotel in February 2012, drew nearly 200, including some who had travelled from Hong Kong, North Queensland and Perth to attend. Later annual re-unions have attracted around 50.

On the demise of the Push, Anne Coombs has stated: "[... things began to change] in 1964, the year the Beatles came and brought into the open that new phenomenon: 'youth culture'." Citing this, Alan Barcan added "In advocating free love and opposition to authority, the Push and the Libertarians anticipated the new post-1968 morality. But the adoption of many of their ideas by society undermined their raison d'être".

== See also ==
- Socialism in Australia
- Anarchism in Australia
