= What About the People! =

Poetry book by Dorothy Hewett and Merv Lilley

- Author: Dorothy Hewett, Merv Lilley
- Genre: Poetry
- Publisher: National Council of the Realist Writer Groups
- Publication date: 1962
- Publication place: Australia

What About the People! is a joint 1950 book of verse by Dorothy Hewett (1923-2002) and Merv Lilley (1919-2014). It was the first book-length publication of poetry by either poet. What About the People! represented much of their significant output up to that time. The 1962 reprinting contained 43 poems by Lilley and 31 by Hewett, with one poem probably composed jointly.

The original version of the book existed only as a gestetnered copy in 1950. The collection was not published in book form until 1962.

Many of the poems were in rhyming couplets with choruses, which attracted aspiring folk musicians. More than a dozen poems were set to music, and some, especially “Weevils in the Flour” and "Norman Brown" have become part of the Australian folk music canon.

== Contents (1962 version) ==
H = Hewett, L = Lilley

1. "The Lost Word" L
2. "What About the People" L
3. "Clancy and Dooley and Don McLeod" H
4. "The Fencer" L
5. "Lucky Gem" L
6. "Once I Rode with Clancy" H
7. "Fragments of Gershwin" H
8. "Country dance" L
9. "So Many Girls Are in my Arms Tonight" H
10. "The Scab and the Cross" L
11. "A Station Hand's Reply" L
12. "Machines Don't Spend Much Money" L
13. "Humpty Doo, Alan Chase" L
14. "The Death of Henry Armstrong" L
15. "Solitude" L
16. "In Midland Where the Trains Go By" H
17. "Banard Black" L
18. "Because There is a Loveliness That Burns" H
19. "When Freedom Cannot Marry" L
20. "Testament" H
21. "Gather Round the Sign-ons" L
22. "Cane While I'm Able" L
23. "Big Bundles and Run" L
24. "Cut Out" L
25. "The Story of Little Joe Flood" H
26. "Bill Brown Died in Kalgoorlie" H
27. "Until Another Man's Killed" L
28. "Lead Bonus" L
29. "Ballad of Norman Brown" H
30. "Drink Away" L
31. "Salute Old Hands" L
32. "My Party is the Party of Aragon" H
33. "Cane Killed Abel" L
34. "The Birchgrove Park" L
35. "S.S. Ellaroo" L
36. "Ned Skidmore" L
37. "A Fireman's Dream" L
38. "Bundaleer Blues" L
39. "And a Haven Forever More" L
40. "The Canecutter's Comeback" L
41. "Go Down Red Roses" H
42. "Where Sailors Belong" L
43. "My Love on Whom the Good Sun Shone" H
44. "Song of the West Coast Seaman" H
45. "Spello, Spell" L
46. "Defiance from Port Hedland" L
47. "There is Anguish in Knowing" H
48. "Nostalgia" L
49. "The Sailor Home From the Sea" H
50. "Nursery Lessons" L
51. "Atomic Lullaby" H
52. "Lullaby for Katie" H
53. "My Love is Full of Summertime" H
54. "Jazz" H
55. "Benny Paret" L
56. "Where I Grew to be a Man" H
57. "I Am Spain" H
58. "Verwoerd, Verwoerd They Cry" H
59. "Behind Barbed Wire" L
60. "An Arab's Blood is Mine" L
61. "What's Your Name?" L
62. "Song to Lumumba" H
63. "March Through Perth" H
64. "Requiem for a Child Who Died of Leukemia" H
65. "Sweet Song for Katie" H
66. "A Word for the Criminal" L
67. "To a Poet Who Came to Nothing" H
68. "The War of Self-Interest" L
69. "Three Men" L
70. "To The Communists" H
71. "Fidel" L
72. "Have You Heard the Children Singing" H
73. "Women's day - March 8" H
74. "Window on Sydney" H
75. "The Pick-up Shed" HL

== Poems by Dorothy Hewett ==
Hewett included five poems from 1945-46 (3,7,20,54,57) in the book, including the seminal poems “Testament” and “Clancy and Dooley and Don McLeod” which had established her as a lyric poet and as a topical balladeer.

Twelve of her poems in the book were published in the literary journals Overland, Westerly or Realist Writer between 1959 and 1962. “There is a Loveliness that Burns” and “My Love on Whom the Good Sun Shone” were included in her 1971 play The Chapel Perilous.

I passed my love on the street today
He looked through my head and he looked away.
When I searched through the dust I could only find
A man with his lips and his eyes half blind,
And all that I was, and all that I knew
Was gone with the wry dry dust that blew.

— "My Love on Whom the Good Sun Shone"

Six of the poems were political from the point of view of women or children, several expressing hope for a new life for her baby daughter Kate Lilley (52,65). Three concerned her belief that atomic testing was responsible for the death of her first child from leukemia (51,64,72). Four were love songs to Lilley (41,44,49,53) and three to her former partner Les Flood (18,43,47). Two concerned her wheatbelt ancestors (6,20) and two were a romantic vision of the city (16,43). The last has been frequently anthologised:

In Midland in the railway yards,
The black smoke thunders on the sky,
Still in the grass the lovers lie,
And cheek on cheek and sigh on sigh
They dream and weep as you and I,
In Midland where the trains go by.

— "In Midland Where The Trains Go By"

Nine of the poems (3,6,16,18,20,41,47,65,74) were included in 1968 in Hewett's first solo book of poetry, Windmill Country.

== Poems by Merv Lilley ==
Most of Lilley’s poems are about working in the bush – seven are about sugar cane cutting (21-24,33,40,48), seven about the sea (34-39,45) and four about mining. Others are about general bush work (4,11), horse riding (5,17), the tension between marriage and freedom (19,42), automation (12,14) and fighting (26,30,55). There are a number of political poems about bosses (13,27), unions and solidarity (10,28,31,43,46,69) and police brutality (66).

Lilley said he did most of his writing for the book at sea, and his sea poems are among the most lyrical:

As she rocked and jarred and plunged across the wastes of the paddock wild
I dreamed I fought with a great grey wolf as it picked at the bones of a child
And millions of pickers were waiting below in the depths of the churning sea
And I was a child in the watery wastes and the pickers were waiting for me.

— Merv Lilley, "And a Haven Forever More"

One of Lilley’s most memorable songs was about the wreck of the SS Birchgrove Park in 1956, the last real shipwreck in the Sydney area:

O beckoning lights of Sydney town
Still beckoning men as the ship goes down
It is for the love of your winking lights
That colliers drown on lonely nights

— Merv Lilley, "The Birchgrove Park"

== Joint writing ==
The title poem (2) and the major ballad (3) lead off the book with a call for self-determination and better treatment for Aboriginal people.

Ten other political poems (37-41,43,65-68) are featured. Both authors express similar themes - solidarity with: the Communist Party, Katanga, Cuba, South Africa and the nuclear disarmament movement,

“The Pick-up Shed” is credited in the book to Hewett and in songbooks to Lilley. It is told in two different voices, and it may be the case that the first two verses were written by Hewett and the last two by Lilley.

== History and reception ==
Hewett had left a wealthy Western Australian farming and shop-keeping family to join the proletariat, while Lilley was a knockabout Queensland character who had worked at various manual jobs, including canecutter, stoker, and wool presser. They met at a joint performance of the Sydney Realist Writers and the Bush Music Club around 1957, and they married at the start of 1960.

By the age of 23, Hewett had won two national poetry prizes, but she discontinued writing in 1946 to focus on activism and child-rearing. She renewed her literary career in 1957, now producing material with mostly a socialist realist slant.

Lilley had been in contact with John Meredith since 1955, who had helped him publish several songs in the first editions of Singabout. He also published seven poems and four short stories between 1955 and 1961 in the literary magazines Overland, Realist Writer and Westerly, mostly about rural work.

At the end of 1961, just prior to setting off on a caravan trip from Perth to Rockhampton with four children, Lilley and Hewett gestetnered about a hundred copies of What About the People! with the help of Hewett’s 11 year old son Joe Flood. The cover was silk-screened.

The book proved popular, and in 1962 Frank Hardy of the National Realist Writers Council decided to publish it. In the introduction, Hardy praised Hewett’s first novel Bobbin Up, and the efforts of Hewett and Lilley to raise the stature of poetry in the labour movement.

Dennis Kevans enthused in Tribune about these “imaginative and deeply analytical poets of the people. These poets do not apologise. They relish struggle and the competition of life…the sweat and toil and heat of love feed the brain and the brain tempers the body”. Hal Colebatch, a right-wing activist but a friend of Hewett and Lilley, considered their verse was “shot through with lines different and superior to the run of party-line versifying of the day”.

Gilman (2014) saw the book as a classic call to action, formulated on the basic principles of Soviet socialist realism: the spirit of the people and the party. A number of poems do express a direct call to action (3,25,46,58,62,70) from Hewett and (29,31,46,71) from Lilley.

== Songs ==
(Composer in brackets)

- Birchgrove Park (40:42), The Pickup Shed (46:57) Anti-fouling roll (48:30) (Bill Berry)
- Weevils in the Flour, Sweet Song for Katie, Atomic Lullaby (Mike Leyden)
- Sailor Home from the Sea (Bill Berry, Chris Kempster, Martin Wyndham-Reid, Poole)
- Cane Killed Abel (Chris Kempster)
- Clancy and Dooley/Black Strike) (Tom Flood)
- My Love on Whom the Good Sun Shone (Frank Arndt)

Others: Norman Brown, Song of the West Coast Seaman, Little Joe Flood

Lilley and Hewett submitted three songs each to the Jim Healy Memorial Waterside Workers Song Competition in 1963, and came first and second respectively. Lilley won overall with “Anti-fouling roll”. This song was not included in the book, although it was set to music by Berry at the same time as his other songs.

== The 1961 Gestetner version ==
Very few copies of the home-typed 1961 Gestetner edition have survived, and the hand-copied volume is now a collector's item. It contains only 28 poems by Lilley and 25 by Hewett.

The 22 new poems in the 1962 edition were all written in Queensland during 1962, with the exception of "Testament". From the list of contents in the 1962 edition, these added poems are 10,11,12,20,33,36,38,40,42,45,50,55,59,62,64,65,66,69,70,71,73,75.
