= Weevils in the Flour =

Australian folk song

Song
- Published: 1960
- Recorded: 1963
- Genre: Folk
- Songwriters: Dorothy Hewett, Michael Leyden

"Weevils in the Flour" is a song derived from a poem written in 1960 by Dorothy Hewett, "Where I Grew to be a Man" (often titled "Island in a River"). It was published first in Tribune in 1960 and then in Hewett's joint book of verse What About the People! published in 1963. The poem was put to music in 1963 by Michael Leyden. It tells of a child growing to be a man in a makeshift settlement during the Great Depression in Newcastle NSW. The settlement lay directly opposite Australia’s largest steel factory, owned by the mining giant BHP. The song describes the privations of the settlers and the environmental degradation of the area. In the last verse it reaches an upbeat conclusion:

"For dole bread is bitter bread
There's weevils in the flour
But men grow hard as iron upon
Black bread and sour
There’s weevils in the flour."

— Dorothy Hewett, "Island in a River"

== The island in the river ==
The islands at the mouth of the Hunter River at Newcastle, NSW, were once in the 1840s a naturalist’s paradise, where artists, scientists and collectors visited. The explorer Ludwig Leichhardt stated in 1842 that Ash/Muscheto island "is a remarkably fine place, not only to enjoy the beauty of nature, a broad shining river, a luxuriant vegetation, a tasteful comfortable cottage with a plantation of orange trees… It’s a romantic place, which I like well enough to think that – perhaps – I’d be content to live and die there."

The islands were settled, and for over fifty years, Muscheto island provided dairy, fruit and vegetables to the growing industrial town of Newcastle. In 1913 BHP bought the land of the former Botanic Gardens in Mayfield, Newcastle and opened a massive steelworks two years later. Also in 1913, the State sought to redevelop “useless swamp lands along the south arm of the Hunter River” and convert them to industrial heartlands. including a dockyard commenced at Walsh Island. The NSW Minister for Works resumed much of Muscheto Island for "homes for Dockyard workers" but nothing was built and the site stood empty. In 1933 as an outcome of the Depression, the Walsh Island dockyards closed, leaving the employees destitute, so they built shanties on the island site.

In 1955 a flood devastated the settlement, In the 1960s, families living there were issued with resumption orders and the entire area was devoted to heavy industry and a coal port. The many islands of the Hunter estuary were gradually glued together with slag and other industrial pollutants and refuse as a convenient dumping ground, and became a single island, Kooragang island.

== History ==
The poem is based on recollections of the life of Hewett’s friend Vera Deacon, who was brought up on Muscheto Island. According to Hewett’s husband Merv Lilley, “(Hewett) had sent something she'd written to Tribune, they sent it back and it wasn’t political enough. So she says 'I'll give them something political!' and she wrote Island in a River”.

After the Tribune publication in November 1960, the family self-copied a combined book of poems by Hewett and Lilley called What about the People! which was eventually published in 1963.The book came into the hands of several aspiring folk musicians who provided melodies for eleven of the poems. One of these composers was Michael Leyden, the son of Hewett’s friend, the publisher Peter Leyden. He took four of the original eight verses from the poem for the song, and recorded it in 1963 on an EP under his father's licence. The song was published along with other Michel Leyden songs in Australian Tradition in 1965.

In 1965 Gary Shearston recorded the song on his album “Australian Broadside”. The record came under threat of legal action from BHP,

Declan Affley’s version, recorded at a concert in the 1970s, is regarded as the most compelling. The recording is included in the Declan Affley 1987 memorial LP. It was one of many songs chosen for the Living Democracy exhibition which opened in July 2009 in the Museum of Australian Democracy, Old Parliament House, Canberra.

Robyn Archer included the song in her show "Robyn Archer: an Australian Songbook" in 2022.

== Reception ==
The song became a workers' anthem, performed by folk singers and choirs. It is published in many books and databases of Australian folk songs.

The phrase "weevils in the flour" has entered the Australian vernacular as evocative of the Depression years. The title was borrowed for a pioneering oral history of the Depression by Wendy Lowenstein.

The song has developed its own folklore. During a taxi ride in Newcastle, Hewett was told by the driver that her poem was "written there on Kooragang Island by some unknown industrial worker in the 1930s".

== Mentions ==
Many authors have cited lines from the song or referred to the song

- 2003 United Nations. The Challenge of Slums. Global Report on Human Settlements
- 2006 Peter Tyler, Humble and Obedient Servants
- 2011 Peter Corris. The Moorebank Killings
- 2017 Thomas Kenneally. Australians: Flappers to Vietnam
- 2021 Paul van Reyk True to the Land: A History of Food in Australia

== Recordings ==
- 1964 Mike Leyden, unnamed EP, Leyden Publishing
- 1965 Gary Shearston, Australian Broadside. CBS
- 1970s Declan Affley. Concert recording
- 1977 Phyl Lobl. On My Selection. Larrikin
- 1981 Eric Bogle. Down Under, Autogram (Germany) as "Island in the river"
- 1981 Bushwackers Faces in the Street. Avenue
- 1991 Solidarity Choir. Solidarity Choir. Self-released
- 1993 Jane Clifton. "Going Home" - Australian Artists, Australian Songs.ABC
- 1996 The Ragged Band. Up the Sides and Down the Middle. Self-released
- 2002 Chorus of Rebel Voices. Concert recording, 2xx
- 2005 Graham Dodsworth. In Our Time. Self-released
- 2005 Roy Bailey. Sit Down and Sing. Fuse Records
- 2007 Danny Spooner. Emerging Tradition. Self-released
- 2010 Martyn Wyndham-Read, ‘Back to You. Wynding Road Music
- 2012 Joe Flood. 55:00
- 2014 Newcastle People’s Chorus.
