= Marian Henderson =

- Henderson in 1964, from accompanying flyer for PX 008 "Great Folk Songs Of The World - Volume I"

Background information
- Born: Marian Grossman; 16 April 1937; Melbourne, Australia
- Died: 21 May 2015 (aged 78) Mt Mee, Queensland, Australia
- Genres: Australian folk music, jazz
- Occupation: Singer
- Instruments: Guitar, piano
- Years active: 1960s–1970s
- Labels: Music for Pleasure, Pix Records, RCA

Marian Henderson (born Marian Grossman; 16 April 1937 – 21 May 2015) was an Australian folk and jazz singer. She worked extensively in Australian folk and jazz clubs during the 1960s and 1970s and appeared on television and a number of Australian folk music recordings, though recorded only one album under her own name.

== Early life and education ==
Henderson was born Marian Grossman in Melbourne, Australia, on 16 April 1937, to an air force family which moved frequently with her father's job, resulting in her attending 13 schools.

Her first musical instrument was piano, which she played by ear in her early teens. From age 18 she commenced singing jazz (frequently with rock-and-roll bands) and then gravitated towards folk music, learning the guitar with which to accompany her own singing in the style of other popular performers of the early 1960s.

== Career ==
She formed a rock and roll band, the Thunderbirds, with fellow musician/songwriter Don Henderson (later her husband), before she lost interest and turned to jazz singing.

From 1961 to 1962, Henderson joined with the Australian folk singer Alex Hood and international jazz guitarist/commercial artist Chris Daw, recently arrived in Sydney, in the trio "Daw, Hood And Henderson" which released an EP of "workers' songs", Oh Pay Me, in 1962.

From 1963 onwards she was featured as a solo performer at popular Sydney folk music club "the Troubadour" three or four nights a week, performing a mix of British, American and Australian traditional material, and in 1964 was recruited by Pix magazine to record a series of EPs of folk songs for its readers. She performed on ABC Television show including "Jazz Meets Folk" from 1964 onwards alongside jazz musician Don Burrows and others, whose backing also featured on her Pix recordings, plus an episode of the folk music show Dave's Place in 1965.

Along with Gary Shearston, Tina Lawton, Martin Wyndham-Reade, Jeanne Lewis, Lenore Somerset, and compere Leonard Teale, Henderson was scheduled to appear at the Australian Newport Folk Festival which was held at the Newport Oval in Newport, New South Wales from 8-10 January, 1965. It was estimated by The Canberra Times that the festival was expected to bring in up to 12,000 people over its three-day run.

Her own album, Cameo, was released on MCA in 1970; in addition to touring in Australia, she also performed overseas including in New Guinea, Fiji and Ireland. In 1971 she took the female lead on two tracks on fellow Australian singer Harry Robertson's seminal album of whaling songs, Whale Chasing Men, singing lead on "Norfolk Whalers" and "Whaling Wife". Henderson was also the host and featured singer in a new contemporary music show on Australian television, Sit Yourself Down, Take A Look Round, that premiered in 1974.

Henderson was an attraction in the Australian folk and contemporary/popular music scene up till the late 1970s, when she effectively retired from music to bring up her son, first in Lismore then in the small village of Nimbin, New South Wales. In 1978 she participated in a one-off progressive jazz rock recording by a group entitled "First Light", released on Music Farm Studios, a small label operating out of the Byron Bay hinterland. She made her final recorded appearance (a duet with fellow singer Margret RoadKnight) at a live concert by the latter recorded in Nimbin in 1988.

== Personal life and death ==
Henderson married twice. She married her ex-schoolmate and fellow musician/songwriter Don Henderson in 1958. Don encouraged her career and wrote songs for her to sing but the marriage lasted only until 1962. Marian, however, kept the surname Henderson as a performing name for the remainder of her career.

She later married Tom Baker, with whom she had a son. Baker died in 1970.

In her later years Henderson lived quietly in an artistic environment, enjoying camping, the beach, and creating a beautiful garden. She died in 2015 aged 78, after suffering from cancer from several years; her ashes were scattered at the small New South Wales coastal town of Brunswick Heads.

== Legacy ==
On her death, the Australian folk music promoter and commentator Warren Fahey noted:

Marian was there at the beginning of the so-called folk revival. She made several recordings (never enough), appeared at countless concerts and was ever-present at peace marches and other demonstrations for a better world. ... Her singing was exceptional. Wonderful breathy phrasing and clear enunciation married a husky, beautiful voice that was as comfortable with jazz as folk music. She wrote songs but in my mind is best remembered for her singing of traditional songs.

An extended reissue of Henderson's 1970 album Cameo was released in 2016 on the Stoned Circle label, incorporating all known additional tracks from her hard-to-find earlier EPs plus other material.

== Discography and filmography ==
- Daw, Hood And Henderson: Oh Pay Me (6 track EP, Blue and White Collar Records BW 1, 1962) (with Chris Daw and Alex Hood)
- Various artists: Old Botany Bay (Music for Pleasure 1964). Henderson sings on Adieu to Ye Judges and Juries (with John Currie); The Convict Maid; Van Dieman's Land; Girl with the Black Velvet Band (with John Currie); Moreton Bay; Bold Jack O'Donohue (John Currie with Marian Henderson)
- Marian Henderson: Australian Folk Songs Volume 1 (Pix Records PX-006, 1964: EP). Tracks: Botany Bay; Springtime It Brings on the Shearing; The Old Bark Hut; Peter Clarke
- Marian Henderson: Australian Folk Songs Volume 2 (Pix Records PX-007, 1964: EP). Tracks: Waltzing Matilda; Jim Jones of Botany Bay; Euabalong Ball; Van Dieman's Land
- Marian Henderson: Great Folk Songs Of The World Volume 1 (Pix Records PX-008, 1964: EP). Tracks: Down By The River Side; Lolly Too Dum; Kisses Sweeter Than Wine; This Old Town
- Marian Henderson: Great Folk Songs Of The World Volume 2 (Pix Records PX-009, 1964: EP). Tracks: Swing Low, Sweet Chariot; Kum-By-Ya; Black Is The Colour Of My True Love's Hair; I Know Where I'm Going
- Various artists: "The Restless Years" - 1967 TV show featuring Henderson, Tina Lawton, Declan Affley, Alex Hood, Rob Inglis and Peter O'Shaughnessy with musical assistance from The Claire Poole Singers and the Don Burrows Quintet featuring George Golla - described further here
- Various artists: The Restless Years, book with accompanying LP (1968), Jacaranda Press. Henderson sings "Moreton Bay", "Look Out Below", "The Streets of Forbes" and "Old Black Alice"
- Marian Henderson: Cameo (MCA 1970). Tracks: Antique Annie's Magic Lantern Show; Miss Otis Regrets; Stranger Song; Lady of Carlisle; Fotheringay; Streets of Forbes; First Boy I Loved; Country Girl; Guess Who I Saw Today; Bald Mountain; Convict Maid; Sprig of Thyme
- Harry Robertson: Whale Chasing Men (Music For Pleasure, 1971). Henderson (credited as "Marion Henderson") sings lead on "Norfolk Whalers" and "Whaling Wife"
- Various artists: 3 Floors Down (RCA Camden OCMS 175, 1972). Henderson (credited as "Marion Henderson") sings "Moon and Mice"
- First Light: First Light (Music Farm Studios MFS 0002, 1978). A progressive jazz rock album featuring Marian Henderson on vocals, with Ron Carpenter, Harry Freeman, John Gray, Graham Jesse, Alan Freeman and others.
- Margret RoadKnight: An Audience with Margret RoadKnight (Grevillea Records, 1988). Includes "For All the Good People" (duet Marian Henderson with Margret RoadKnight)
- An interview with Marian Henderson, retired jazz, blues and folk singer by Alex Hood and Annette Hood (2002). Includes "Ben's Waltz" (played during the interview by Marian on her piano at home) http://trove.nla.gov.au/work/16855641?selectedversion=NBD24171678
- Marian Henderson: Cameo (Stoned Circle STC2CD3014, 2016) - re-released as double CD with additional tracks from her earlier EPs etc.
