= Jazz Meets Folk =

- Genre: Music television
- Presented by: Alan Dean
- Country of origin: Australia
- Original language: English

Production
- Running time: 30 minutes

Original release
- Network: ABC Television
- Release: 22 August 1964 – 1964

Jazz Meets Folk is an Australian television series which aired on 1964. It was a music series aired in a half-hour time-slot on ABC Television. It was produced in Sydney, and hosted by Alan Dean; among its featured musicians were the Bryce Rohde Quintet, Don Burrows "plus six", and folk singer Marian Henderson. It premiered on Saturday 22 August 1964.

== See also ==
- Trad Jazz (1962–1963)
- Look Who's Dropped In (1957–1958)
- Sweet and Low (1959)
- Australian All Star Jazz Band (1959)
