= Trad Jazz (TV series) =

- Also known as: Just Jazz
- Genre: Music television
- Presented by: Graeme Bell
- Country of origin: Australia
- Original language: English

Production
- Running time: 30 minutes

Original release
- Network: ATN-7; HSV-7
- Release: 1962 – 1963

Trad Jazz is an Australian television series which aired in 1962 on ATN-7 in Sydney, HSV-7 in Melbourne, and possibly other stations (note: this was before the "official" creation of the Seven Network). Hosted by Graeme Bell, it was a music series with trad jazz music. In 1963, it aired for an additional season as Just Jazz, with the format expanded to include other kinds of jazz music.

It was a half-hour series.

Previously, Graeme Bell had hosted The Graeme Bell Show for ABC during 1958.

Despite having aired during an era where wiping of music shows was common, four episodes are held by National Film and Sound Archive.

== See also ==
- Look Who's Dropped In
- Sweet and Low
- Australian All Star Jazz Band
- Jazz Meets Folk
