= Tina Lawton =

- Born: 23 March 1944
- Died: 24 December 1968
- Occupation(s): Musician, singer
- Instrument: Guitar
- Labels: CBS

Christine Elizabeth "Tina" Lawton (23 March 1944 – 24 December 1968) was a South Australian folk singer and recording artist.

== Background ==
Lawton was born in Adelaide, a daughter of Edgar Vincent Lawton (1908–1990), a pharmacist and executive with Birks Chemists, and Kathleen Elsie Lawton, née Magarey, (1908–1997) of "Miramar", 3 Hilda Terrace, Hawthorn, South Australia, and was brought up in an affluent middle-class surroundings in a musically talented family. Her mother had a good voice, and was frequently called on to sing at functions. She was a granddaughter of Sylvanus James Magarey; the immunologist John William Magarey Lawton (born 1939) was a brother.

Lawton was educated at Unley Girls' Technical High School (Note: Not to be confused with Unley High School, Unley Girls' Technical High School was a government school to Intermediate level, located off Unley Road, offering a mix of technical and commercial subjects. Students at Unley Girls' Technical High School included part-Aboriginal girls from Colebrook Home and Tanderra Aboriginal Hostel at Parkside, notably Lois O'Donoghue), and Doris, sister of Doreen Kartinyeri. Many graduates went on to training as nurses at the RAH. It must be presumed this was Lawton's choice of school, as children of executives would usually attend one of Adelaide's prestigious private schools. Her brother John went to Prince Alfred College. According to the biography The Singing Bird, written by her mother, Tina quit her private school for the less academic and more arts-based environment of the "Tech".) and, in 1961, the South Australian School of Arts.

She made early appearances on Adelaide television in the programs The Country and Western Hour (often in duet with host Roger Cardwell), the Marie Tomasetti Show, and Lionel Williams' Adelaide Tonight. She appeared at Tony Bowden's "Catacombs" (Note: In the basement, "Romilly House", 1 North Terrace, Hackney) and other coffee lounges during the "folk song" boom of the early 1960s.

== Career ==
Along with Marian Henderson, Gary Shearston, Martin Wyndham-Reade, Jeanne Lewis, Lenore Somerset, and compere Leonard Teale, Lawton was scheduled to appear at the Australian Newport Folk Festival which was held at the Newport Oval in Newport, New South Wales from 8-10 January, 1965. It was estimated by The Canberra Times that the festival was expected to bring in up to 12,000 people over the three-day event. The event had been recorded, and according to the 4 March issue of The Canberra Times, there were six programmes. The first of them was to be broadcast by the A.B.C on 7 march. Paul Marks, a jazz / blues singer & guitarist was the featured artist. The second and third programmes would be of Lawton and Lenore Somerset respectively.

She appeared at an Elder Park concert during the 1966 Adelaide Festival of Arts. She appeared in a two-woman show with Glen Tomasetti at John Edmund's Theatre 62. (Note: A "little theatre" at 143 Burbridge Road, Hilton) In 1967 she sang for the Australian troops in Saigon. Leaving Vietnam, she settled in Glasgow, Scotland, where she attended the School of Arts.

== Death ==
During the Christmas holidays of 1968 she holidayed with some friends in Kenya, and while there took a flight into the crater of Mount Longonot. The plane crashed into the inner wall of the volcano, and Lawton, her friend Chris Paul, and pilot Graham Wright were killed instantly.

== Recordings ==
Lawton recorded three albums:

- Tina Lawton (December 1965) CBS Australia
- The Singing Bird (May 1966) CBS Australia
- Fair & Tender (March 1967) CBS Australia

== Biography ==
- Kathleen Lawton (1974) The Singing Bird: Tina Lawton's Story ISBN 0859100138 "Advertising". Victor Harbour Times. Vol. 73, no. 3, 228. South Australia. 4 July 1984. p. 29 – via National Library of Australia. Kathleen was Tina's mother.
