= Gladys Ruth Gibson =

Australian educationist and women's leader

Gladys Ruth Gibson CBE
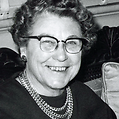
- Born: 29 December 1901; Goodwood Park, South Australia
- Died: 23 August 1972 (aged 70); Belair, South Australia
- Education: University of Adelaide

Gladys Ruth Gibson CBE (29 December 1901 – 23 August 1972) was an Australian educator and member and leader of women's groups, including the National Council of Women of Australia (NCW).

== Early life and education ==
Gibson was born on 29 December 1901 at Goodwood Park, South Australia to Emma (née Keeley) and James Ambrose Gibson. Her father, a deaf mute who collected money for the South Australian Blind, Deaf and Dumb Institution, died in 1931. She attended Goodwood Public School and then Unley High School. after which she was employed as a student-teacher in 1919. Her mother died in 1923 and, as the eldest child, Gibson took over the care of the household and her three younger siblings. She completed a diploma at the Teachers' Training College, and later graduated from the University of Adelaide with a BA (1937) and DipEd (1940).

== Career ==
After finishing school, Gibson was employed as a student-teacher in 1919 at Goodwood Public School and then at Westbourne Park Public School in 1921. She was appointed assistant teacher at Lefevre Peninsula in 1931.

While working at Unley Junior Technical School, in 1941 Gibson was appointed South Australian inspector of schools for girls taking over from Adelaide Miethke. From 1942 to 1963 she was a member of the Public Examinations Board. In 1952 she became inspector of secondary schools, serving in that role until her retirement in 1961.

== National Council of Women and other associations ==
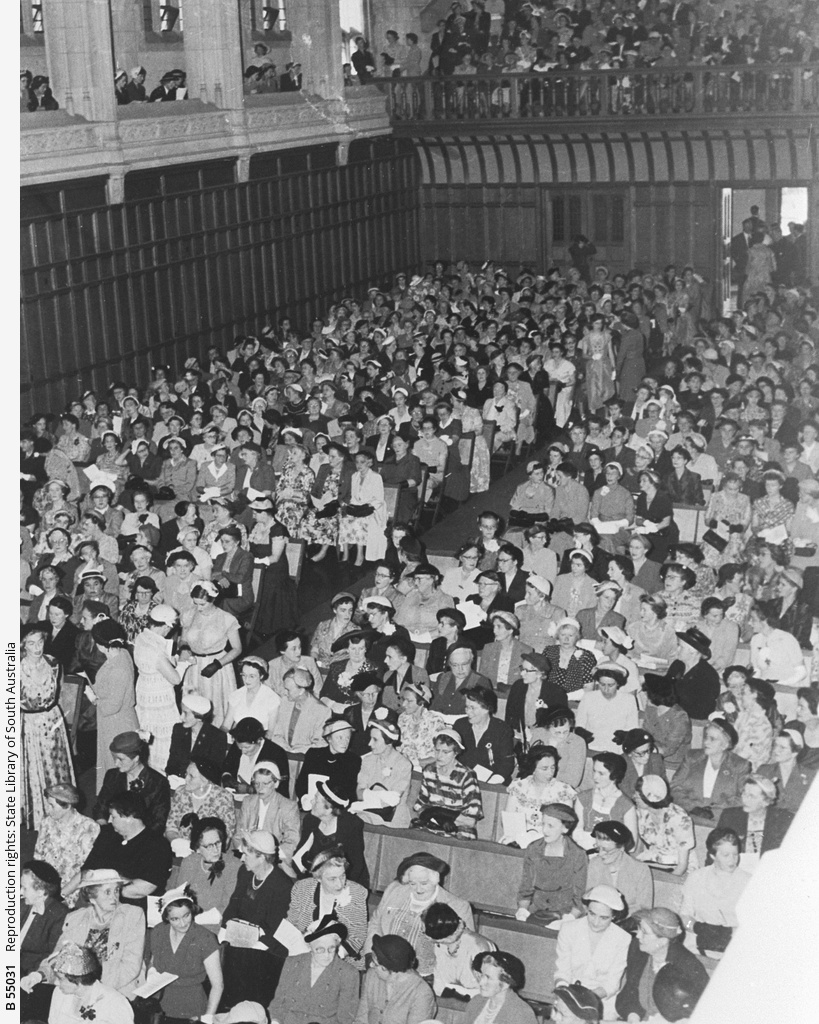
Women in the Bonython Hall for the Address of loyalty to Her Majesty the Queen in 1954

Gibson was chosen as a delegate to represent South Australia at the conference organised by the International Council of Women in Edinburgh in 1938. She was secretary of the NCW from 1939 to 1941 and served as president from 1952 to 1956, as well as being president of the South Australian branch from 1950 to 1954. In 1953 she represented the NCW in Westminster Abbey at the coronation and was presented at Court. The following year she organised the welcome to South Australia for Queen Elizabeth II which was attended by 1100 women.

She was a member and office bearer of the Adelaide Women Graduates’ Association, the Adelaide University Graduates’ Association, the SA Chapter of the Australian College of Education, Florence Nightingale Committee for Nursing Scholarships and the Churchill Fellowship Selection Committee (SA). She also was a founder member of the Adelaide Soroptimist Club, a member of the Adelaide Young Women's Christian Association, the State Council Girl Guides’ Association, the Junior Red Cross Committee, the United Nations’ Association of SA and the Australia Day Committee.

== Honours, recognition and legacy ==
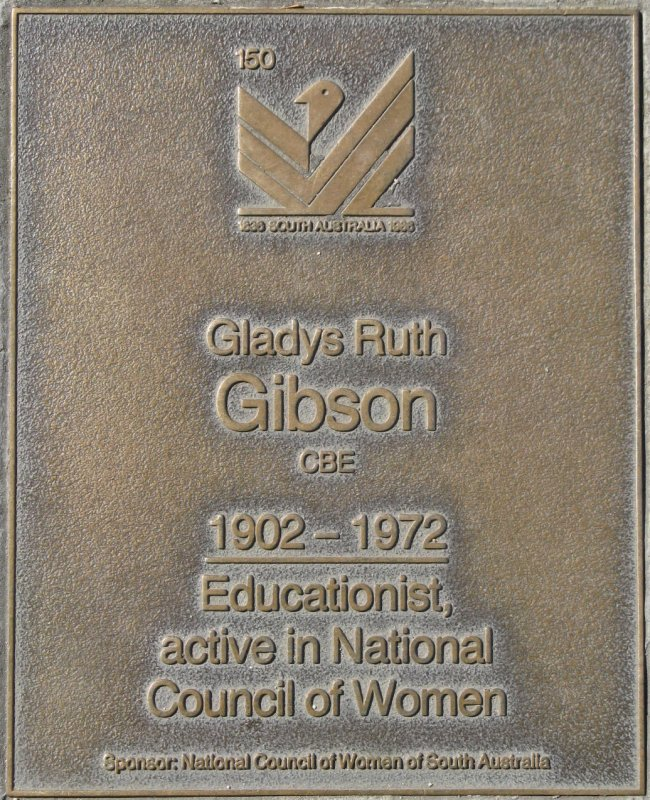
Gibson's plaque on the Jubilee 150 Walkway

Gibson was made an Officer of the Order of the British Empire in the 1953 Coronation Honours for "service to the National Council of Women". She was promoted to Commander of the Order of the British Empire in the 1970 Queen's Birthday Honours for "services in advancing the interests of Australian women".

Gibson died at Belair on 23 August 1972.

In 1974 she was honoured with a bronze sundial, installed outside the Adelaide Festival Centre on King William Road. A plaque was laid in her memory in the Adelaide's Jubilee 150 Walkway in 1986.

The Ruth Gibson Memorial Award is a scholarship inaugurated by the NCW and International Council of Women in 1978 to fund education or overseas study resulting in benefits to the women and girls of the State.

The electoral district of Gibson in South Australia is named in recognition of her contributions.
