= Alex Hood (folklorist) =

Australian singer (1935–2025)

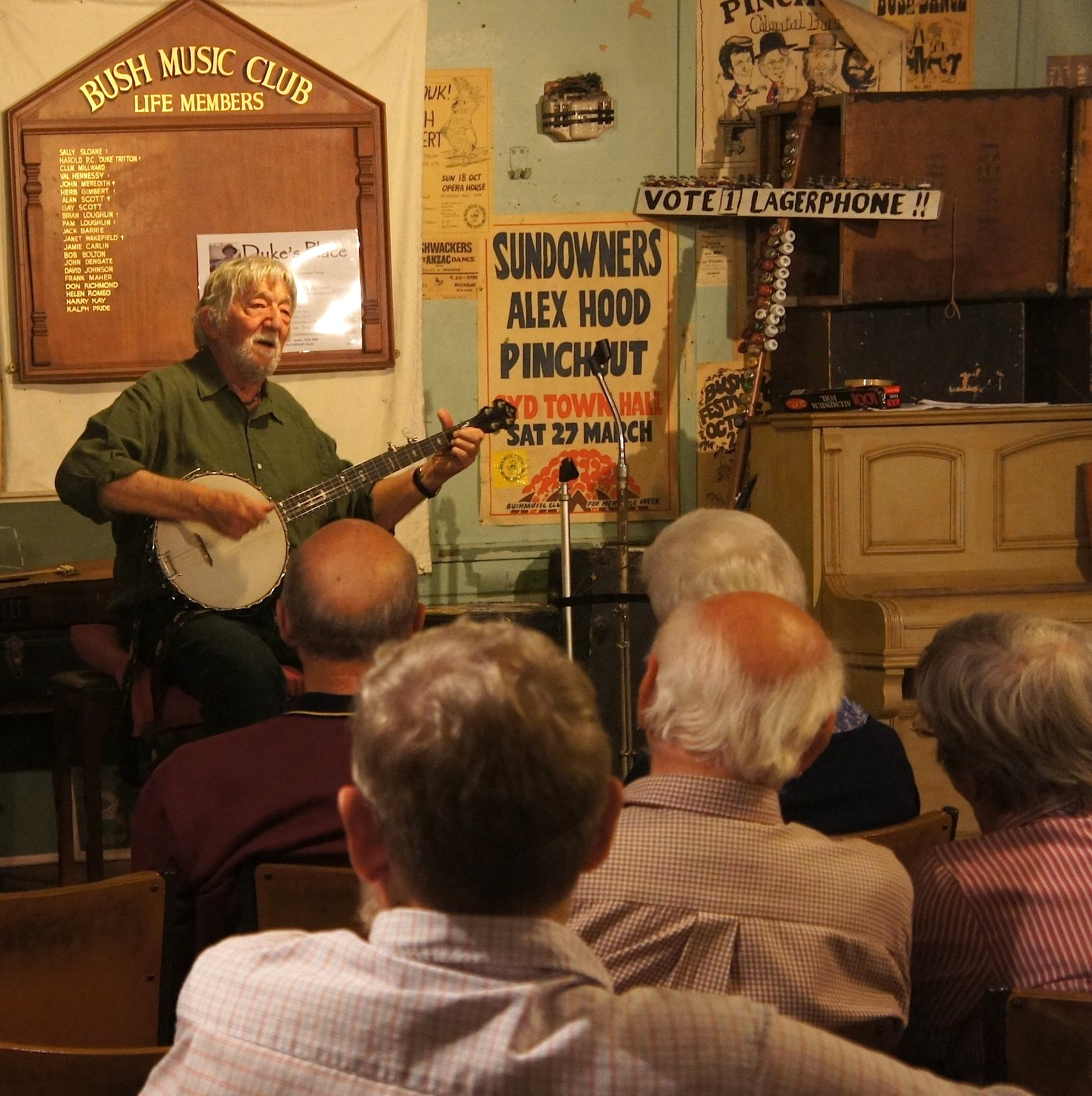
- Hood performing at Sydney's Bush Music Club, November 2014

Background information
- Also known as: Alec Hood
- Born: Alexander Stewart Ferguson Hood; 1935; Sydney, Australia
- Died: 27 November 2025 (aged 89–90)
- Genres: Folk
- Occupations: Musician, songwriter, singer, author, playwright, actor, entertainer, folklorist
- Instruments: Vocals, guitar, banjo, bones
- Years active: 1953–2025
- Labels: Wattle Records, Music For Pleasure Australia, AXIS, EMI Australia

Alexander Stewart Ferguson Hood (1935 – 27 November 2025) was an Australian folk singer, writer, actor, children's entertainer/educator and folklorist.

== Biography ==
=== Early life ===
Hood was born in Sydney and attended Homebush Boys High School, where he gained his Intermediate Certificate. As a teenager he was a keen cricketer but left school at age 15 to take up an apprenticeship as an electrician. He joined the Eureka Youth League, a communist youth association, meeting Bill Berry and Chris Kempster. Kempster, along with the older singer and folklorist John Meredith, a founding member of the (original) Bushwhackers (Australia's first revivalist bush band), were members of the Unity Singers, a Sydney left-wing choir formed in 1951.

=== Initial musical influences and career ===
In 1953 Reedy River, a new Australian musical play based around the 1891 Australian shearers' strike, was created, opening first at the Melbourne New Theatre and then subsequently in Sydney's New Theatre, also in 1953. For the Sydney production, Meredith's Bushwhackers group were selected to provide the musical accompaniment; Hood spent some time "hanging around backstage" and, when Kempster had to take three months leave to perform his national service, the nineteen year old Hood, then known as Alec, deputised for him playing the part of "Snowy". (Hood also later took on the part of "Bob the Swagman" for a time, otherwise played by Cecil Grivas). According to a later account by his partner Annette, Hood's simple but effective method to gain the relevant performance experience was to learn all the lines spoken by all the characters, then step up to deputise for whomever was then absent at any particular time.

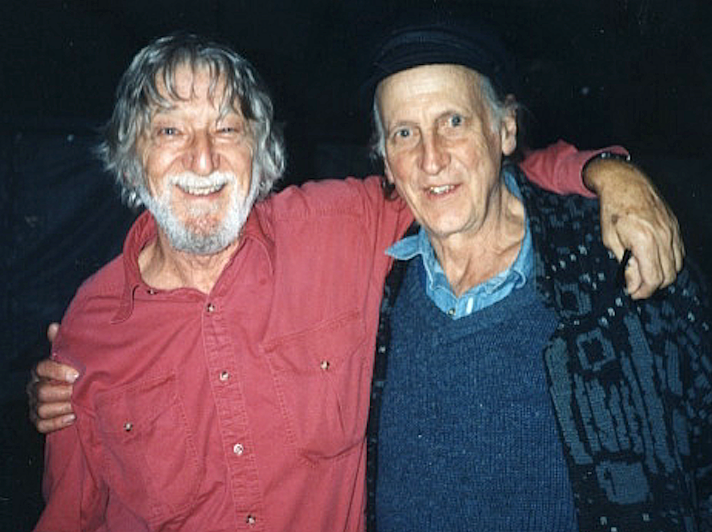
Alex Hood and Chris Kempster at Australia's National Folk Festival, Easter 2000

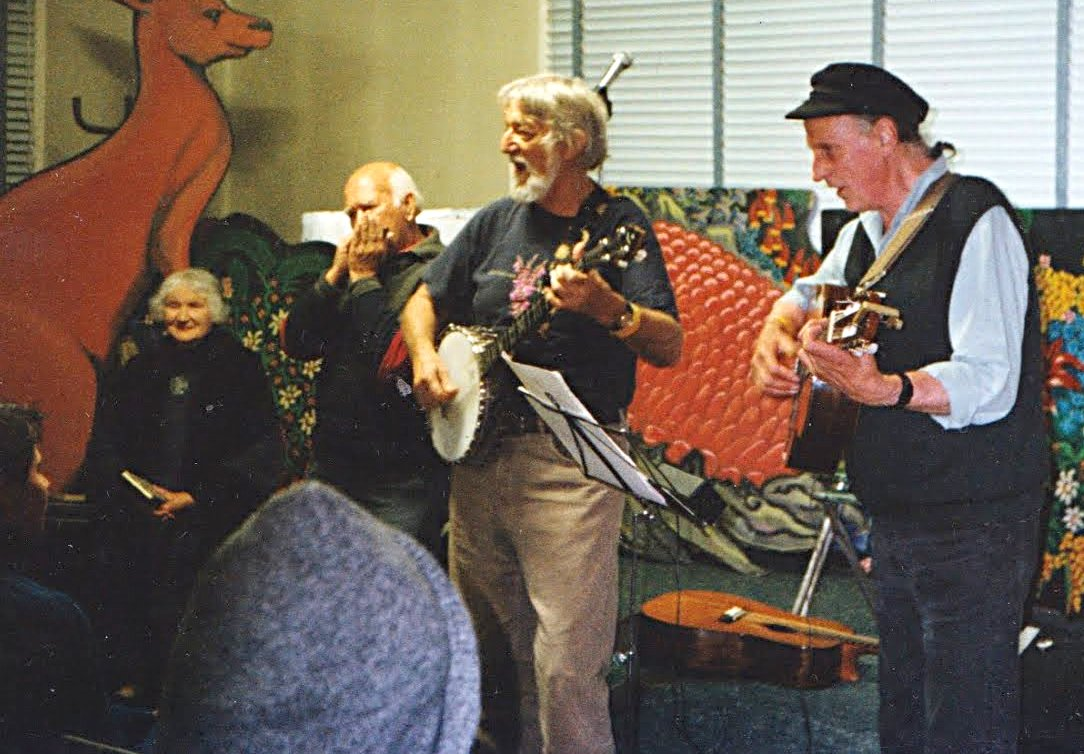
Hood (with banjo) plays at a reunion of the Rambleers in 2002; other members (L-R) are Barbara Lisyak, Harry Kay and Chris Kempster

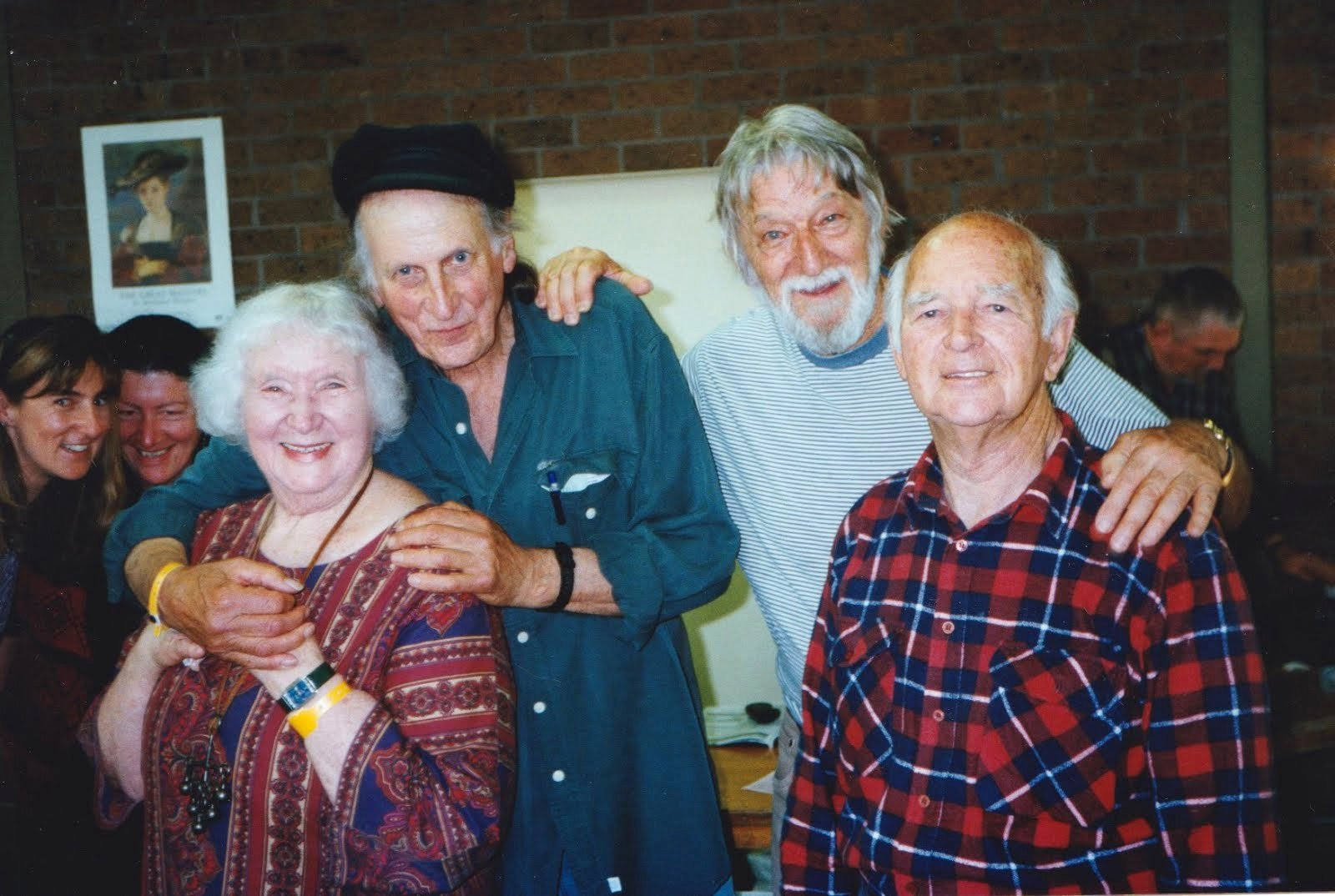
Former members of the Rambleers photographed at the Illawarra Folk Festival at Jamberoo, 2002. L-R: Barbara Lisyak, Chris Kempster, Alex Hood and Harry Kay.

As a result of this involvement, Hood acquired a love of traditional Australian "bush" music and both he and Kempster became accepted members of the band, which however eventually led to friction between them (as the younger members) and Meredith, who decided that the best course of action was to disband the group in 1957, telling the various members that if they wanted to carry on performing, it would be under the auspices of the Sydney "Bush Music Club" (still in existence as at 2020) with which they had all been associated, but no longer under the "Bushwhackers" band name. Hood, together with Kempster on guitar and banjo and Harry Kay on harmonica then formed "The Rambleers", utilizing their preference to sing in harmony as opposed to the unison singing style of the Bushwhackers. The group toured and released a 10-inch LP The Old Bark Hut followed with a 7-inch 33 rpm record Waltzing Matilda, both 1958, and also appeared in a 1960 stage production Fisher's Ghost, a play by Douglas Stewart based on the Fisher's Ghost legend, together with singers Barbara Lisyak and Denis Kevans.

In 1962 Hood teamed up with British singer Chuck Quinton as "The Rambling Boys", spending several months touring with the "Gill Brothers" circus troupe before taking off on their own touring throughout outback New South Wales. Hood and his first wife, Gabrielle, subsequently established the Folk Arts Centre at 90 Queen Street, Woollahra, modelled after Israel Young's Folklore Centre in Greenwich Village, New York City, however the Centre lasted only a year before closing.

From 1961 to 1962 Hood joined the Australian folk/jazz singer Marian Henderson and international jazz guitarist/ commercial artist Chris Daw, recently arrived in Sydney, in a trio "Daw, Hood And Henderson" which released an EP Oh Pay Me (1962); he also performed (solo) on a various artists 1964 EP Basic Wage Dream. He also worked with guitarist Brian Godden as "The Prodigal Sons" (active 1968–69), who recorded a single entitled The Didgeridoo/The Girl on the Five Dollar Note, released by Parlophone Australia in 1969.

Hood released his first solo LP Alex Hood Sings of Australia's First Hundred Years in 1964 in conjunction with a pocket songbook. This was followed by a number of other albums including The Second Hundred Years (1970), Songs From the Wallaby Track (c. 1971), Seasons of Change (1975), Songs While the Billy Boils (also released as Songs of Australia) (1977), Me and My Friends (1979), Sydney or The Bush (c. 1982) and Me and More Friends (1991). He also contributed to a book + LP release The Restless Years in 1968, along with the actor/reciter Peter O'Shaughnessy and singer Marian Henderson (the package was a spin-off of a 1967 TV film of the same name written and acted in by O'Shaughnessy), and was instrumental in getting the Scottish-Australian singer Harry Robertson recorded for the label MFP Australia in 1971, during which he took the lead vocal on two of Harry's songs on the resulting Robertson album Whale Chasing Men: Songs of Whaling in Ice and Sun. During the 1960s he performed as a duo with Larry King (the latter under the persona of "Clancy Dunne"). As Alex and Clancy they performed across Australia in clubs, coffee shops, festivals, and concerts, however when he found that the (then ubiquitous) smoking in venues was resulting in him losing his voice, the duo moved more into performing for children at school shows.

In conjunction with his albums of songs, Hood wrote a number of books, plays and folk operas for children, including "Pumpkin Paddy meets the Bunyip" and "Brumby Jack Saves the Wild Bush Horses" (both 1972), "The Flying Pieman" (1974), "Herman's German band meets Thunderbolt" (1974) with Robert Smith, and "Speewah" (1978). Songs from "The Flying Pieman" were also released on LP in c. 1974.

Commencing in the 1970s, and then from the 1980s through to 2015 with the Australian Folk Theatre, Alex made a special point of travelling to the Northern Territory, frequently funded by different Arts Councils, in order to perform for audiences of Australian first nations children and adults.

=== Field and oral history recordings ===
Hood began to record traditional music, folklore and oral histories when he was touring in rural New South Wales in 1968. In 1972 he recorded Aboriginal children of Arnhem Land singing and chanting while on an Arts Council tour of the Northern Territory. These recordings became part of the Alex and Annette Hood Collection now held at the National Library of Australia, which consists of about 200 recordings made between 1968 and 2006. The early recordings contain folk music and folklore, but most of the later recordings are oral histories including interviews with miners, drovers, bullock drivers, farmers, folk singers and dancers, as well as a cattle dealer, a photographer, a town planner, a jockey, a conservationist, a coach builder and a doctor, mostly recorded in New South Wales with some forays into Queensland. Included in the interviewees are politicians (Doug Anthony), photographers (Robert Walker), writers (Merv Lilley and Roger Milliss), singers (Marian Henderson) and the dancer Garry Lester.

=== Australian Folk Theatre (Alex and Annette Hood) ===
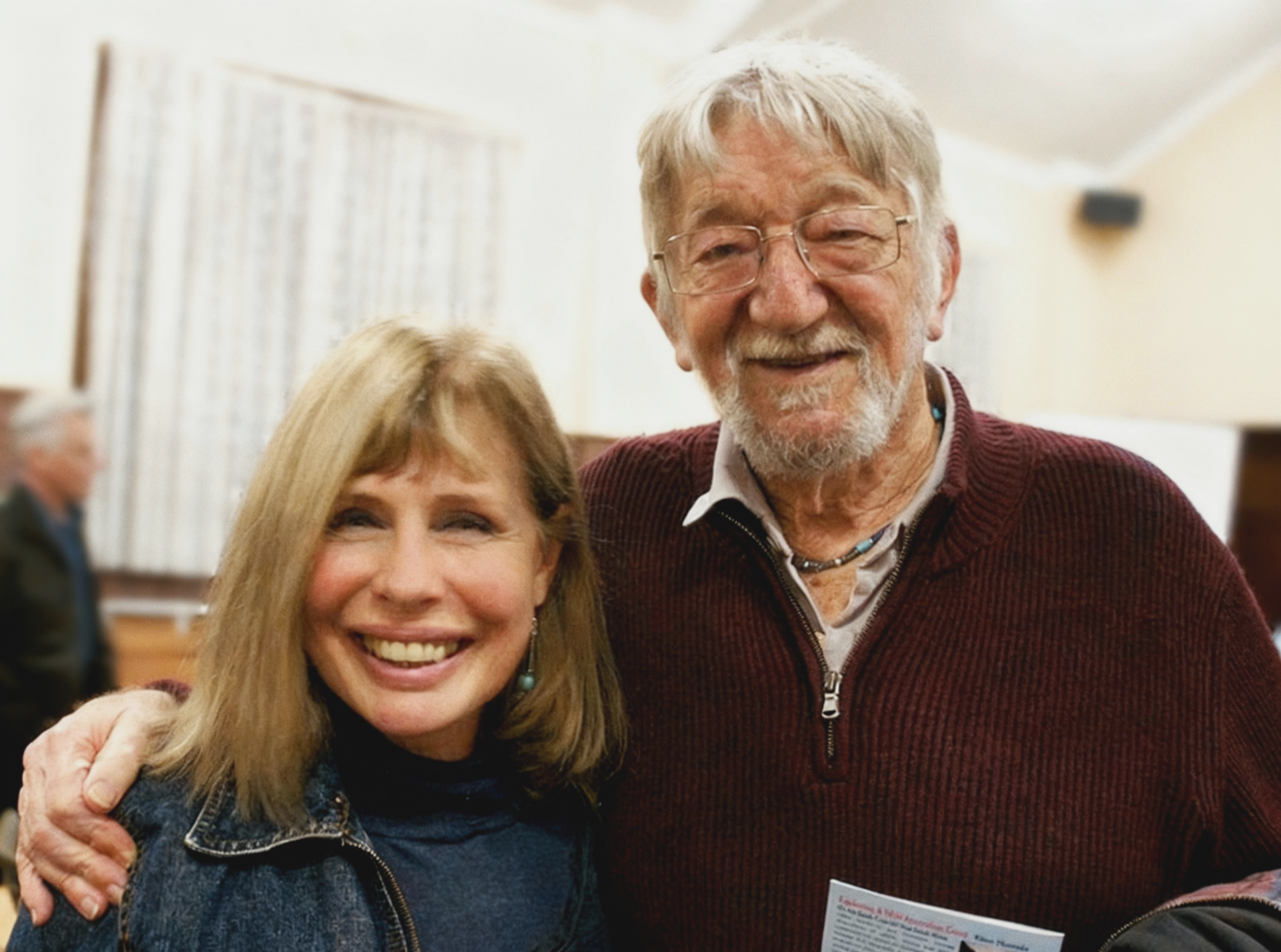
Annette and Alex Hood at the 2014 launch of Keith McKenry's biography of John Meredith

In 1982 Alex met Annette James (b. 1948 in Sydney), who had trained as a dancer, and together they created their "Alex and Annette Hood's Australian Folk Theatre" (1986 onwards). Subsequently married to Hood, she accompanied him on his country tours and in particular was responsible for the puppets, costumes and backdrops for the Folk Theatre show, which toured Australia for 24 years performing songs, dances, stories and yarns to audiences of children, having completed over 7,500 shows by 2012. The show often featured humanitarian and environmental themes and toured constantly, filling out its busy schools schedule with additional shows for adults and performances at Australian folk festivals.

=== Later career ===
Hood kept up a busy schedule as entertainer, recording musician, playwright and actor for many years and was featured in 2014 (aged 78–79) at Sydney's still-operational Bush Music Club, as well as the 2017 Illawarra Folk Festival. Alex and Annette eventually retired to the Kiama district of New South Wales, where Alex continued to perform in public on an occasional basis. Meanwhile, Alex and Annette also continued to make oral history recordings for the National Library of Australia; by late 2019 there were 63 such sessions added to the relevant collection dated 2010 and later.

Alex and Annette Hood received the 2020 National Folk Festival Lifetime Achievement Award for "significant commitment and contribution to enriching folk music and culture in Australia".

Hood died in Australia on 27 November 2025, at the age of 89–90.

== Discography ==
=== With The Bushwhackers ===
Wattle Records "A Series" 78s

- A1 The Bushwhackers: The Drover's Dream / The Bullockies' Ball (1956)
- A2 The Bushwhackers: Travelling Down the Castlereagh / Australia's on the Wallaby (1956)
- A3 The Bushwhackers: Old Bullock Dray / Nine Miles from Gundagai (1956)
- A4 The Bushwhackers: Give a Fair Go / Rabbiter (not issued?)
- A5 The Bushwhackers: Botany Bay / Click Go the Shears (1956)
- A11 The Bushwhackers: Black Velvet Band / The Hut That's Upside-Down (1956)

"B Series" 7-inch 33 rpm EPs

- B1 The Bushwhackers: Australian Bush Songs (1957)
- ?? The Bushwhackers: Nine Miles from Gundagai (1957)

=== With The Rambleers ===
- The Rambleers: The Old Bark Hut (10-inch LP) Wattle C 8, 1958
- The Rambleers: Waltzing Matilda/The Shearer's Dream" (7-inch EP) 1958
- The Rambleers: The Shearers Dream (78 rpm record) Wattle A17, 1959

...The above recordings reissued on CD with additional tracks as The Rambleers National Library of Australia/Wattle Recordings (no number), 2002; also includes unreleased recordings for a performance of the Douglas Stewart play "Fisher's Ghost" with singers Barbara Lisyak & Denis Kevans, 1960.

=== Short films ===
The following short films were released under the name "Wattle Films". Silvia Salisbury stated in 2012: "These short films used Australian songs sung by Alex Hood as a background to a film version of the song. ... These films were sold to the ABC to be used as fillers when programmes finished early due to the ABC not having advertisements." It is not known whether the vocals used were new recordings, or were recordings already available on previous Wattle releases.

- Wattle Ballad Series No. 1 Old Black Billy The Rambleers 1961
- Wattle Ballad Series No. 3 Reedy River The Rambleers 1961
- Wattle Ballad Series No. 4 The Old Bullock Dray The Bushwhackers 1961
- Wattle Ballad Series No. 5 Click Go the Shears The Rambleers 1961

=== As "Daw, Hood And Henderson" (with Chris Daw and Marian Henderson) ===
- Daw, Hood And Henderson: Oh Pay Me (6 track EP) Blue and White Collar Records BW 1, 1962

=== Solo and with others ===
- Various artists: Basic Wage Dream (6 track EP) Blue and White Collar Records BW 2, 1964 (as Alec Hood; other tracks by Arthur Greig, Don Ayrton and David Lumsden)
- Alex Hood Sings of Australia's First Hundred Years MFP-A8041, 1964
- Peter O'Shaughnessy, Marian Henderson and Alex Hood: The Restless Years (Book and accompanying LP). Jacaranda Press, Sydney, 1968 (?1970)
- The Second Hundred Years MFP-A8133, 1970
- Songs From the Wallaby Track AXIS 6029, c.1971
- The Flying Pieman AXIS 6146, c.1974
- Seasons of Change AXIS 6218, 1975
- Songs While the Billy Boils MFP-A8225, 1977 (?same as Songs of Australia, AXIS 6007, 1977; the latter subsequently on CD by Sony BMG Music Entertainment 82876869672)
- Me and My Friends MFP-A8220, 1979
- Sydney or The Bush EMI, 1981 (?1982)
- Me and More Friends Albert Productions 469322 2, 1991
- Alex Hood sings Australian folk songs in the Alex Hood folklore collection – Recorded on 11 April 2002 in Canberra A.C.T. (not for commercial release, recording available via the National Library of Australia, catalogue record available here)
- Included on Various artists: The Songs of Chris Kempster CKP041 2006
- Included on Various artists: Songs of Don Henderson Shoestring Records SR 81 2009

== Books, plays and notes ==
- The Old Bark Hut (1958): Notes and text of songs to accompany 1958 Rambleers' recording of "The Old Bark Hut", Wattle Recordings
- Australian Folksong Songster (1964). Description: "Australian folk songs songster, no. 1 : Authentic Australian folksongs from Alex Hood's L.P. record 'The first hundred years'"
- Albert's Australian folksongs song folio. [No. 1] arranged by Alex & Gabrielle Hood (1964)
- The Pumpkin Paddy Songster (1970) – Music; for medium voice with guitar chords.
- The Wallaby Track : an Australian folk opera in ten episodes / songs presented by Alex Hood; dialogues for the plays: Alex Hood (1971)
- Pumpkin Paddy meets the Bunyip (1972) illustrated by Suzanne Dolesch
- Brumby Jack Saves the Wild Bush Horses (1972) illustrated by Suzanne Dolesch
- The Flying Pieman: a musical play by Alex Hood (1974)
- Bill Jinks and the Whale (1974) illustrated by Bob Smith
- Herman's German band meets Thunderbolt (1975) illustrated by Robert Smith
- Speewah (1978) drama/musical; illustrated by Penelope Janjic
- Eureka : Beneath the Southern Cross (1984) (ABC education radio feature for primary schools)
- Songs of Australia (1988)
- Queensland Arts Council presents Alex and Annette Hood in Across Capricorn: study guide (1998) [written and edited by Sandra Gattenhof]
