= Craig McGregor =

Australian journalist (1933–2022)

Craig Rob Roy McGregor (12 October 1933 – 22 January 2022) was an Australian journalist, essayist, academic, cultural observer and critic.

== Life and career ==
McGregor grew up in Jamberoo and then Gundagai in New South Wales, before his family moved to Sydney. There he was awarded a scholarship to attend Cranbrook School, but he left at 16 to work at the Sydney Morning Herald. He completed a degree at the University of Sydney through night classes.

He wrote books on Australian society, politics and popular culture, as well as two novels and a collection of short stories. He also wrote the script for a section of the 1973 film Libido and co-wrote the 1976 rock opera Hero. He won two Walkley Awards for his journalism: in 1977 for Best Newspaper Feature Story, and in 1986 for Best Feature in a Newspaper or Magazine. He met and interviewed Bob Dylan during his 1966 tour of Australia, and later edited the book Bob Dylan: A retrospective. He has his own entry in The Bob Dylan Encyclopedia.

McGregor was Emeritus Professor of Visual Communication at the University of Technology, Sydney, where he taught between 1988 and 2000. He and his wife Jane, who married in 1961, had four children. He died on 22 January 2022, at the age of 88.

== Books ==
- Profile of Australia (1966)
- The High Country (1967)
- People, Politics and Pop (1968)
- To Sydney with Love (1968)
- In the Making: Australian Art and Artists (1969)
- Don't Talk to Me about Love (a novel, 1973)
- Bob Dylan: A retrospective (editor) (1972)
- Life in Australia (editor) (1972)
- Up Against the Wall, America (1973)
- The Great Barrier Reef (1974)
- The See-through Revolver (a novel, 1977)
- The History of Surfing (1983)
- Soundtrack for the Eighties (1983)
- Time of Testing: The Bob Hawke Victory (1983)
- Pop Goes the Culture (1984)
- Real Lies (short stories, 1987)
- Headliners (1990)
- Class in Australia (1997)
- Australian Son: Inside Mark Latham (2004)
- Left Hand Drive: A Social and Political Memoir (2013)
