= Hero (musical) =

- Music: John 'Poli' Palmer
- Lyrics: Don Henderson
- Book: Craig McGregor
- Productions: 1976 Sydney

Hero is a rock musical with book by Craig McGregor, lyrics by Don Henderson and music by John 'Poli' Palmer. It concerns a pop singer's odyssey in search of stardom with strong undertones of Greek tragedy. The story is about two brothers, loosely based on the Greek myth of Castor and Pollux. The older brother is an ambitious politician, whereas the younger brother is a successful rock star.

== Development and production ==
The Australian Opera and its NSW Friends supporter group in 1973 commissioned rock journalist McGregor to write a rock or pop opera about his idea of the modern hero. McGregor was inspired to write the musical after watching The Who perform a concert version of their rock opera Tommy in New York.

Hero opened on 27 May 1976 at the Seymour Centre's York Theatre in Sydney, produced by the Australian Opera. The cast included Barry Leef, Juliet Amiet, Kris McQuade, Ron Barry, Paul Johnstone and Ian Turpie. It was directed by Grahame Bond with choreographer Ross Coleman and musical director Geoff Oakes.

The production had a mixed critical reception. Closing after two weeks, the production lost in the order of $170,000.

== Recordings ==
Original cast member Barry Leef recorded "Last Song" and "Three-Minute Hero" from the musical for Festival Records in 1976, released as a single. Demo recordings of two songs were included in the compilation The Songs of Don Henderson, released posthumously in 2009.
