= Unley Girls' Technical High School =

Former school in South Australia

Unley Girls' Technical High School was a secondary school in South Australia. It opened in 1927 as Unley Central Girls School and in 1965 merged with Mitcham Girls' Technical High School, moving to new premises. The development of the boys' section of Unley Central School and Unley Technical High School, which occurred in parallel, is mentioned in passing.

== History ==
In 1925 the Education Department of South Australia added secondary schools to the grounds of nine of Adelaide's largest primary schools: Croydon, Hindmarsh, Goodwood, Lefevre's Peninsula, Nailsworth, Norwood, Port Adelaide, Thebarton, and Unley, this last resulting in the formation of Unley Central Girls School, the first students (around 100) being drawn from Parkside, Highgate, Mitcham, Gilles Street, Flinders Street and various county centres. The Central Schools were intended as an alternative to high schools (such as Unley High) for students who were not academically inclined but required advanced education. Apart from the usual subjects of English, mathematics, geography and so on, students were taught technical skills of dressmaking, millinery, art and craft, housewifery and cooking. Typewriting and shorthand were added later to make them better suited to commercial occupations. (Note: The school may have been renamed "technical high" around this time. No announcement of either development has been found, but was a "technical high" by 1947. South Australia's first Technical High School, an offshoot of the "School of Mines" (South Australian School of Mines and Industries), was called exactly that (initialized THS), then from around 1930, Adelaide Technical High School (ATHS).) The first headmistress was Helen Janet Thomson (1878–1962), who retired in 1938. The fine two-storey brick building was located at the corner of Wattle and Rugby streets, Unley, and had separate accommodation for boys (whose technical subjects included wood and metalwork, housed in less imposing tin sheds) and girls. The boys' headmaster was John Michell.

The next change of name came in 1940, when "super primary" (roughly ages 12+) "Central" schools were renamed "Junior Technical", and the primary grades (roughly 7+) became simply "Primary" schools, so Unley Central School became Unley Junior Technical School, with both boys' and girls' sections. The date when Unley Junior Technical became Unley Technical High has not been found, but must have been around 1945.

One author remembered Unley Girls' Technical High School as a fee-paying school to Intermediate (third year of high school) grade in the 1950s, located in Wattle Street, off Unley Road, and offered a mix of technical and commercial subjects. In her time the headmistress was a Mrs Maschmedt, (Note: Z. A. Maschmedt, moved to Unley from Port Pirie West in 1941.) and many graduates went on to training as nurses at the RAH. Students included mixed-race Aboriginal girls from Colebrook Home and Tanderra Aboriginal Hostel at Parkside; notably Lois (later Lowitja) O'Donohhue and Doris Kartinyeri, sister of Doreen Kartinyeri.

In 1965, faced with declining enrolments, Unley Girls' Technical High School was absorbed into Mitcham Girls' Technical High School, moving into the old Unley High School building on Kyre Avenue, Kingswood, between Victoria Terrace and Rugby Street. For some years there was an embarrassing duplication of equipment.

== Some teachers ==
- Gladys Ruth Gibson, who in 1941 succeeded Adelaide Miethke as inspector of schools for girls
- Miss N. Davies, "the human history book" A senior teacher, she argued for less time to be spent on literature and more on science.
- Phyllis May Stoward (1901–1967), art potter, encouraged craftwork. A daughter of Tom Hardy Stoward, she was a member of the Hardy family of winemakers.

== Notable students ==
- Lowitja O'Donoghue, Aboriginal activist
- Tina Lawton, folk singer
