= Royal George Hotel, Sydney =

Historic pub in Sydney, Australia

Royal George Hotel
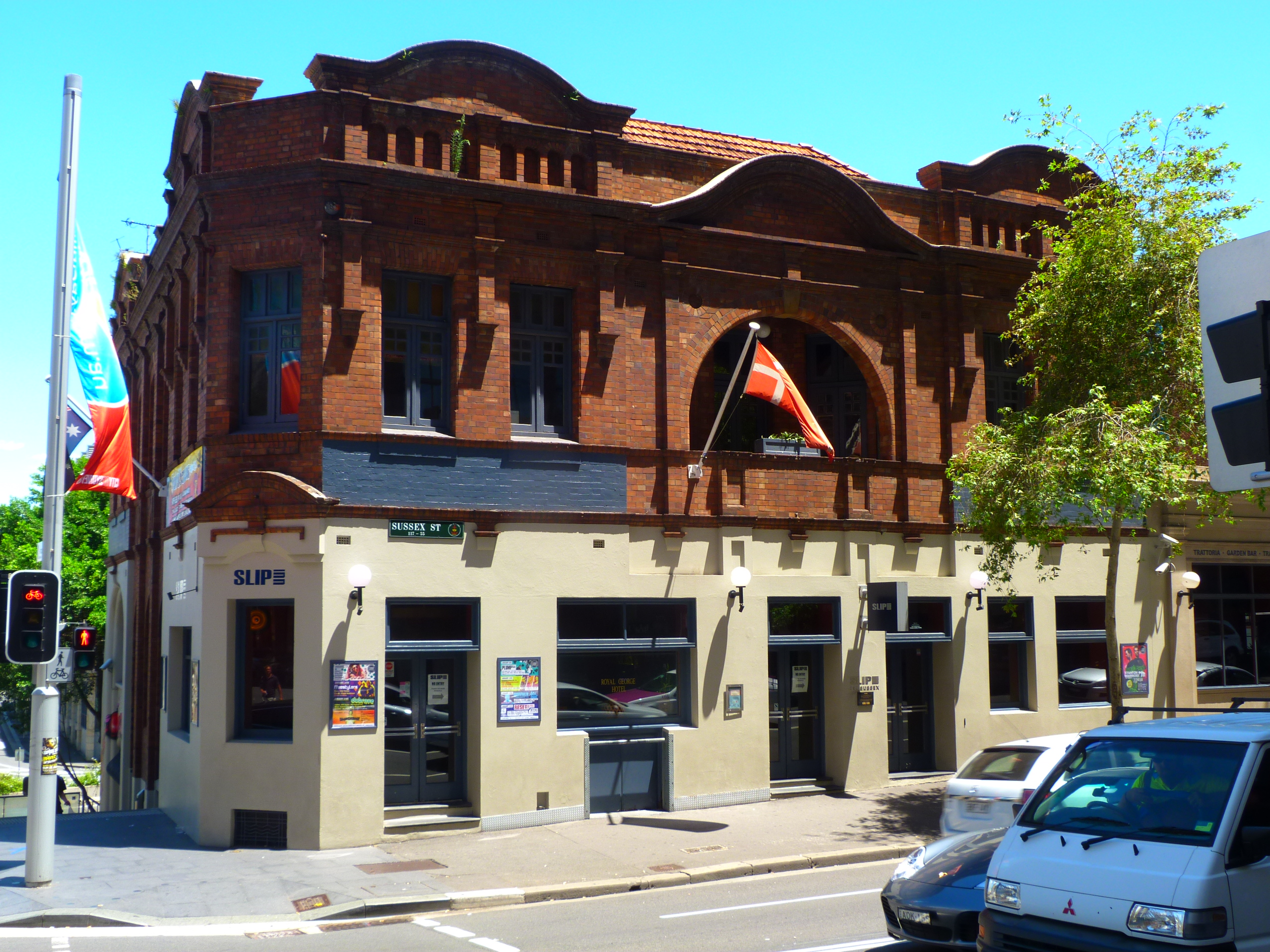
- The building in 2010

- Location within Sydney Location within Australia
- 33.8687°S 151.2034°E
- Location: 115–117 Sussex Street, Sydney, Australia

History
- Built: 1903

Site notes
- Architectural style: Federation Free Style

New South Wales Heritage Register
- Official name: Royal George Hotel; The Slip Inn
- Type: State heritage (built)
- Designated: 2 April 1999
- Reference no.: 411
- Type: Hotel
- Category: Commercial

The Royal George Hotel is a heritage-listed pub located at 115–117 Sussex Street, Sydney, Australia. It was built in 1903. The adjoining former Cuthbert's Patent Slip building, assumed to date from 1869 and also heritage-listed, has also been incorporated into the hotel complex in recent decades. The hotel now operates as the Slip Inn.

== History ==
The Royal George is located on a parcel of the original European grant to James Edrop in 1837. A map of 1843 indicates that the Patent Slip Wharf and a building occupied the Sussex Street frontage. The Patent Slip Hotel was located on the north-west corner of Sussex and King Street, the site of the present Royal George Hotel. Around 1869, this site was vacant. The area of the Patent Slip occupied part of the western half of the present hotel site, used in the repair of small vessels. The first occupant of the Patent Slip was John Cuthbert in 1867. A second building on the site was leased to the publican of the Patent Slip Inn and may have been on the site of the present Royal George Hotel. This building was owned by James Edrop. In 1882 the Patent Slip Hotel changed its name to the New Wharf Hotel, then in 1888 to the Royal George Hotel. The property title was transferred to Edward John Edrop in 1896 and leased to Andrew Cockrane, who named it Cockrane's Hotel.

The site of the present hotel was resumed by the Government of New South Wales in 1900 after the outbreak of plague, which then passed to the Sydney Harbour Trust. It was leased by Edmund Resch, Sydney brewer (later incorporated as Resch's Limited) in 1903, and to Maitland Brewing Co. in 1912. In 1904 Day Street was widened and extended ending the waterfront connection. Ownership of the site passed to the Maritime Services Board in 1939. It was leased it to Tooth & Co and the licensee was Mary Glasheen.

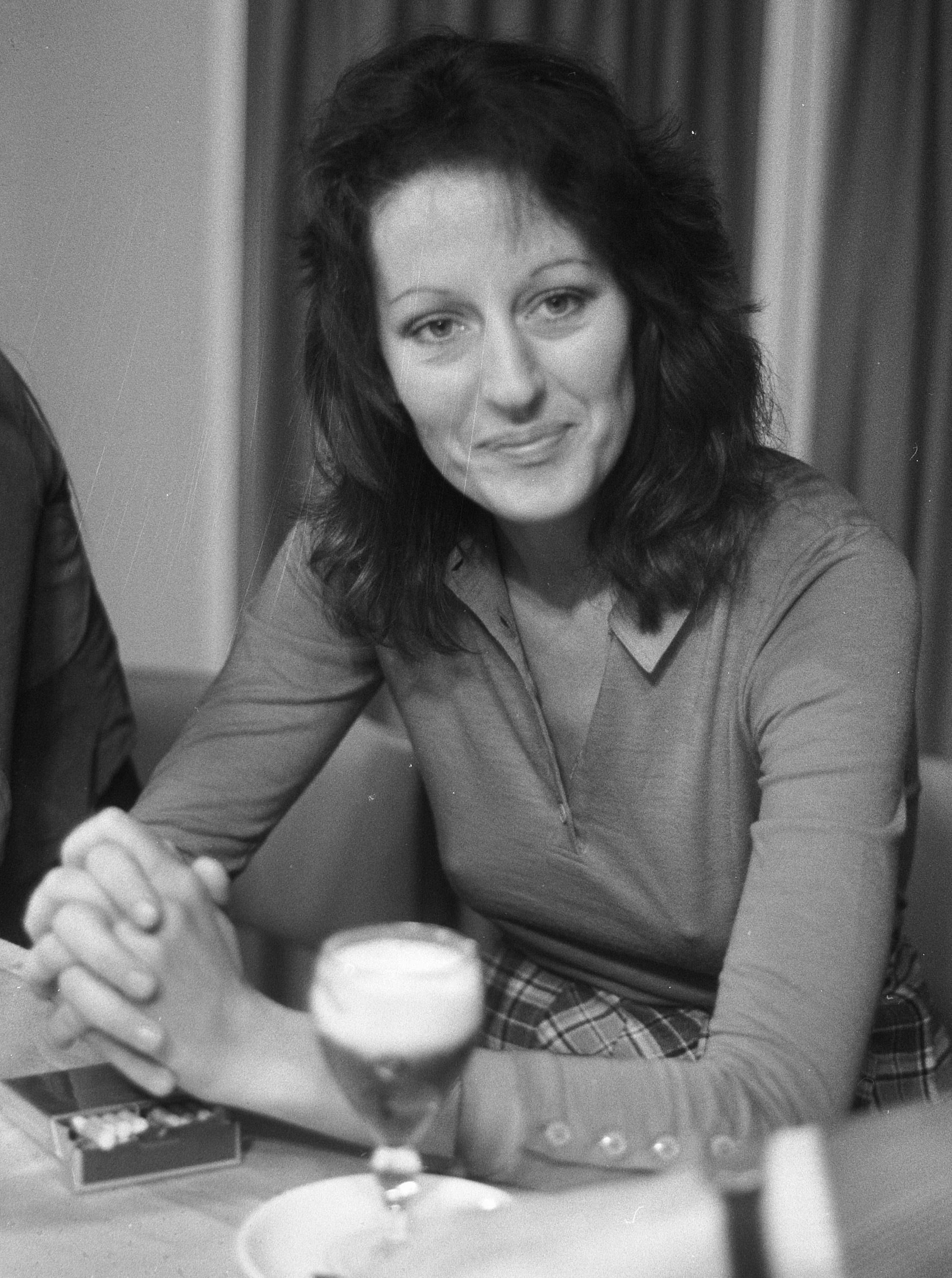
Germaine Greer, part of the Sydney Push, frequented the hotel during the late 1960s and early 1970s.

The hotel was a focus of the Sydney Push intellectual subculture during the 1950s and 1960s, with Germaine Greer, Robert Hughes and Richard Wherrett among those who frequented the venue. It was also popular with figures from the Australian Labor Party, with Neville Wran regularly drinking there in the 1960s. A Robert Hughes mural adorned a wall of the hotel for a period. The hotel's Side Bar was largely a gay venue during this period.

In 1969 the property was resumed by the Department of Main Roads for realignment of Day Street, at which time the licensee was Sidney Willis. In 1975 the licensee was Colin Briggs; 1980 Kevin James; 1982 J. & L Ferris and C. James; 1984 P. Randall, P. and M. Lloyd. The property was put up for sale in 1985. The state government's decision to sell the hotel was controversial as the then-leaseholders claimed to have spent a significant sum renovating the building from a "derelict" state. It sold to Harry Galleia in October 1985, who later sold it to the former leaseholders. In 1991, the owners went into receivership after a failed sale attempt and reported trading problems caused by construction in the area. It was still trading in its original incarnation in May 1993, but had its hotel license transferred to the new CBD Hotel in August 1993. It was refurbished for conversion into a restaurant, but remained vacant.

In May 1996, prominent hotel and fashion figures John and Merivale Hemmes purchased the disused hotel for $1.48 million, subsequently revealing that it was to be the second venture for their son, Justin Hemmes, after the CBD Hotel. It reopened as the Slip Inn in late 1997 after a $5 million refurbishment. The refurbished hotel attracted a number of prominent celebrities, with Jack Nicholson, Kevin Costner, Keanu Reeves, U2 and Helena Christensen among those to visit in the first year.

The hotel was later subject to international attention as a result of Frederik X, King of Denmark having met his future wife, Mary, Queen of Denmark at the hotel during the 2000 Summer Olympics. The hotel ran a "Meet your prince at the Slip" marketing campaign to capitalise on the attention.

=== 107–113 Sussex Street ===
The building at 107–113 Sussex Street, while historically separate from the hotel, has been incorporated into it in recent decades. It is assumed to have been built in 1867, as incised on the parapet, by John Cuthbert, the then-occupier of the adjacent Patent Slip (built by John Booth in 1864). Cuthbert was one of Sydney's prominent boat and ship builders. The Sussex Street level of this building was occupied by commission agents and produce merchants. By the middle of the 1880s the Patent Slip and wharf were occupied by timber merchants. In 1886 W. Howard Smith & Son redeveloped the Patent Slip as a wharf. At the turn of the century the building had a bull-nosed corrugated iron awning with a sign `J. Smith Co Ltd' on the southern panel. In 1900 the site was resumed by the State government for the Sydney Harbour Trust and in 1904 Day Street was widened and extended, cutting off the Sussex Street premises from the waterfront. In 1921 the rear of the site and the lower levels were occupied by Mercantile & Sussex Free Stores Ltd. Maritime Services Board acquired the site in 1936 and the Sussex Street level was used as storage and an office. The 1970s construction of the Western Distributor and creation of Slip Street caused the resumption of some of the site. In 1987 there were major alterations to the building, including partial use as a restaurant, as well as erection of the garage structure facing Slip Street.

== Description ==
=== Main hotel building ===
The Royal George Hotel is a two-storey face brick building with two basement levels located on a prominent site at the corner of Sussex and King Streets. The two storey facade to Sussex Street drops away to the west to a four-storey frontage to the recently realigned Day Street. The main frontage of the hotel to Sussex Street retains the original face brick and highly articulated moulded brick detailing to the upper floor but has been rendered to the ground floor facade. The original doors to the bars have been retained on this face and also the decorative small pane windows, but some areas of brickwork have been painted on the building. Recessed balconies feature to both the east and south facades. An arched window opening has been filled in on the south. The interior of the bars, the living areas and the bedrooms have been modified for use as restaurants and new kitchen facilities have been constructed on two floors. Some original internal fabric such as stairs, plaster decorative detailing, cornices and ceiling roses, fireplaces and leadlight windows have been retained.

=== 107–113 Sussex Street ===
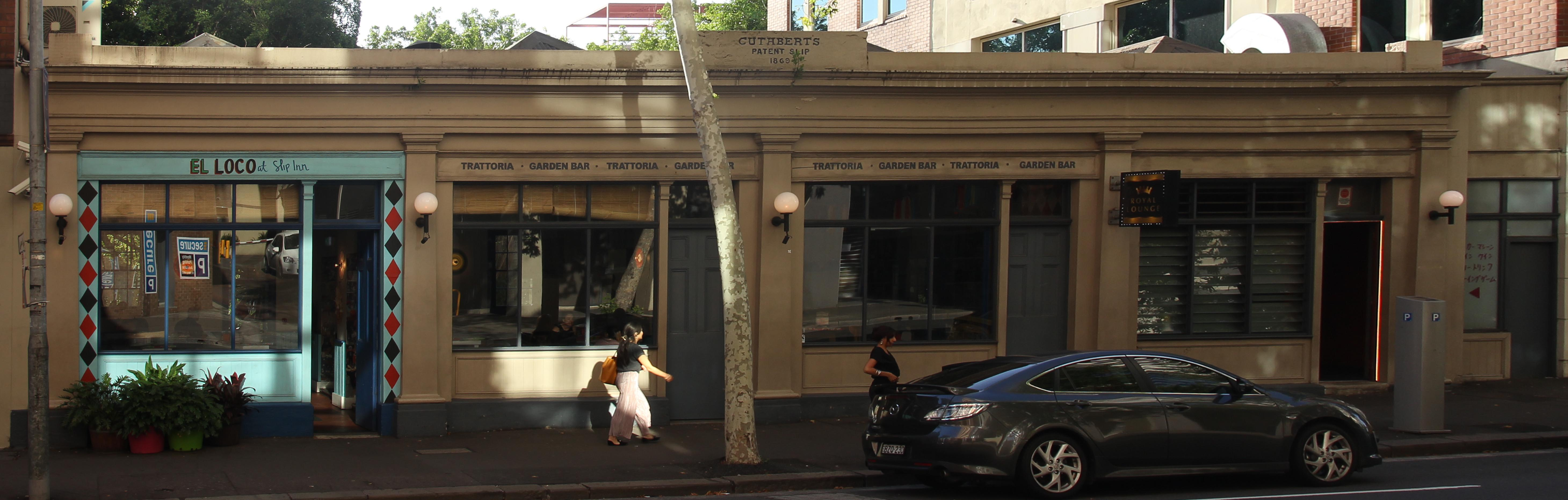
107–113 Sussex Street, pictured in 2019.

This group of four brick-walled terraces, is single-storeyed onto Sussex Street with two-storeys at the rear. The terraces are hip-roofed and divided by party walls. The facade consists of four glazed shopfront bays, articulated by piers and fronted by Tuscan pilasters, which rise from a sandstone base to a moulded entablature, supported upon a timber bressummer above each shopfront. The parapet with sandstone centrepiece with incised lettering CUTHBERT'S PATENT SLIP 1869. Each `shop' has a 6-panel door and toplight separated by a thin timber pilaster post from a full-width three-light window. The terraces at street level are assumed to have been two rooms deep, but are now interconnected as one. The storey below Sussex Street now has doorways opening on to the roof garden above the recent Slip Street level garage. Brick piers support the timber girders of the upper floor except on the east side, where a sandstone retaining wall bears the load.

== Significance ==
=== Main hotel building ===
The Royal George Hotel, a two-storey face brick building in the Federation Free Style, has historic significance for continuing the traditions of the hotel trade from the early years of the nineteenth century, and for replacing an earlier hotel of the same name on the site. It has significance as part of the development of the early Sussex Street precinct and as part of the redevelopment of the Darling Harbour wharf areas. It is significant as a fine and largely intact external example of the style used in a prominent corner hotel. The building makes a strong contribution to the character of the immediate area. The hotel had significance as part of the network of small purpose built hotels providing a social / recreational venue and budget accommodation for the local community as well as the waterside worker but this is somewhat reduced with its closure. It reflects the social character of the area during the early years of the 20th century and is representative of the style used in a prominent corner hotel. The site may have some potential for scientific investigation due to its long usage, however the building itself holds little scientific value. The Royal George Hotel is one of eleven hotel buildings in the style within the city. The others are the Napoleon, the Sir John Young, the Welcome Inn (now known as the Bristol Arms Hotel), the Australian Hotel in Cumberland and Gloucester Streets, the Fosters, the Captain Cook Hotel and the Observer Hotel, the Palisade Hotel and the Read Raters Hotel. The most significant of these are the Palisade and the Napoleon, but the Royal George would be the next in significance after these and the Sir John Young.

=== 107–113 Sussex Street ===
The former Cuthbert's Patent Slip buildings at 107–113 Sussex Street are representative of the historic development of Sussex Street and the harbourside warehousing, evidence of which still forms a strong built edge to this part of the city. It is associated with John Cuthbert, a prominent early boat builder in Sydney. It represents the commercial architecture of the day, still understandable in its context. It has aesthetic significance as a group of unified, low scaled and evocative commercial occupancies now comparatively rare.

== Heritage listing ==
The Royal George Hotel was listed on the New South Wales State Heritage Register on 2 April 1999.

== See also ==
- Pubs in Sydney
