= Harry Robertson (folk singer) =

- Harry Robertson, from front cover art to his album "Whale Chasing Men" (MFP, Sydney, 1971)

Background information
- Born: Henry Robertson; 1923; Barrhead, Scotland
- Died: 15 May 1995 (aged 71–72) Brisbane, Australia
- Genres: Australian folk music
- Occupations: Merchant seaman, whaler, engineer, songwriter, performer
- Instrument: Guitar
- Years active: 1950s–1980s
- Labels: Music for Pleasure (Sydney, Australia)

Henry Robertson (1923 – 15 May 1995) was a Scottish-born Australian seaman, engineer, folk-singer/songwriter, poet and activist, who became a key figure in the development of the Australian folk music tradition. During the 1950s he served in commercial whaling fleets in both sub-antarctic and sub-tropical regions, and wrote a number of songs about his experiences which formed the basis of his 1971 LP release Whale Chasing Men: Songs of Whaling in Ice and Sun, a unique record of life in the whaling industry in the 20th century. He also composed and performed songs on a range of other subjects, including compositions for historical documentaries commissioned by Australian television, a number of which have since been recorded posthumously by musicians interested in perpetuating his musical legacy.

== Biography ==
=== Early life ===
Henry ("Harry") Robertson was born in Barrhead near Glasgow in Scotland in 1923 into a musical family, his mother playing the piano and his father the fiddle, while an uncle taught him to know and love the songs of Robert Burns. In 1940 he commenced a 5-year apprenticeship with Rolls-Royce Limited at their then-new facility in Glasgow, working on the Merlin engines used by the Royal Air Force's well known Hurricane and Spitfire fighter planes and Lancaster bombers, as well as in some marine applications. From 1945 to 1947 he joined the Royal Navy and was deployed as Engineer on naval rescue tugs in the North Sea; the first song he later wrote, "Deep Sea Tug", was subsequently included in the Oxford Book of Sea Songs and dealt with the hazardous nature of the work culminating in the accidental death of one of the crew on such a tug. In 1947 Robertson joined the Shell Oil Company's tanker fleet as a marine engineer during which time he travelled the world "from Texas to Rio then Africa bound", including visits to the U.S. and Brisbane, Australia, a place he would eventually settle; in Galveston, Texas he met and was dismayed by the poverty-stricken occupants of the "squatters' camps" which inspired his song "Homeless Man", which he set to a traditional Norwegian tune.

=== Bound for the subantarctic ===
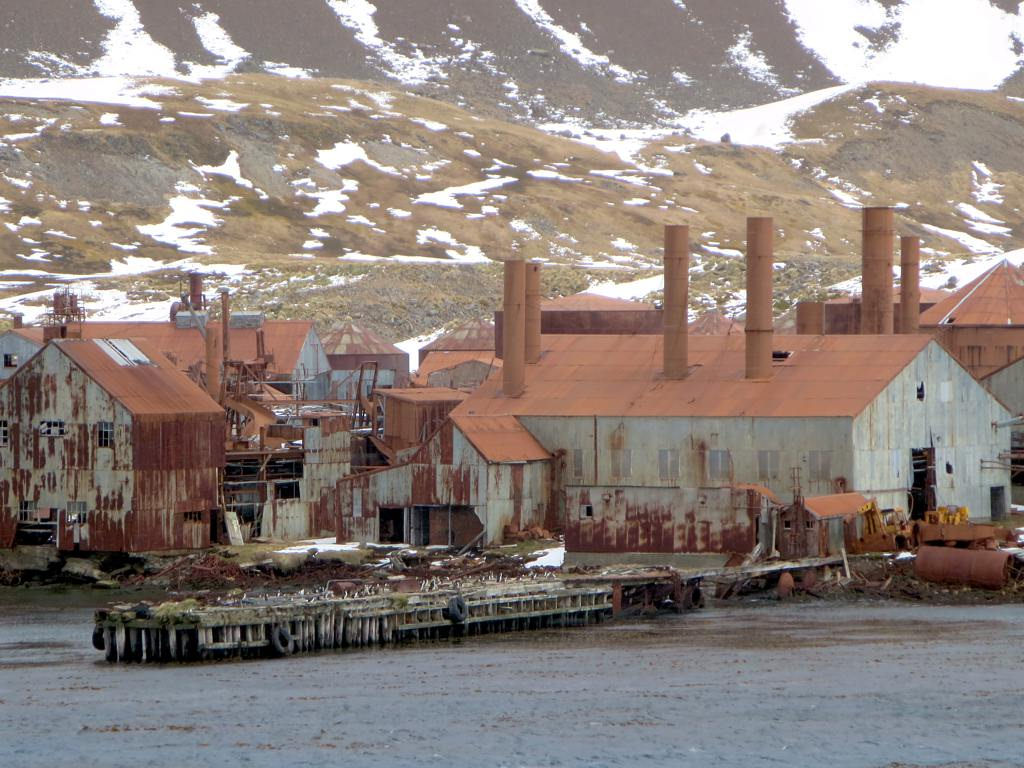
Remains of the Leith Harbour whaling station in South Georgia, photographed in 2014

In 1949 Robertson oversaw the fitting-out of engines for two whale chasing vessels at Smiths Dock in Middlesbrough, England, for the Christian Salvesen Norwegian/Scottish whaling company, and then signed on with one, the whale chaser "Southern Rover" and its factory ship "Southern Venturer" for two seasons as a marine engineer on their deployment to the sub-Antarctic port of Leith Harbour in South Georgia, over-wintering with the fleet in 1950 and 1951 to carry out essential maintenance and repairs. (Note: Leith Harbour was established as both a base for the whaling vessels, and a processing plant for the catches; however, Christian Salvesen & Co. processed their catches at sea on two floating factory ships before returning the whale products to the northern hemisphere for use. A photo essay on the recent state of the now-derelict shore facilities (which closed in 1965) is available here.) Over the dark and cold sub-antarctic winter months, for recreation Harry and his shipmates would sing or recite traditional songs and ballads, as well as songs and poems that they composed themselves; Robertson's songs "Wee Pot Stove" (later covered by UK folk singer Nic Jones on his 1980 album "Penguin Eggs" under the title "The Little Pot Stove", also supplying the title phrase used for the record), "The Antarctic Fleet", "Blubber Laddie", "Processing the Whale", "Whale Chasing Man", "Whaling Wife", and "Time for a Laugh and a Song" detail his experiences from this period. Harry's spoken introduction to "Wee Pot Stove" eloquently conveys the essence of the situation:

I placed the enamelled bucket of home brew on the deck of my cabin. The yellow fluid, barely fermenting now, had the full black bodies of prunes floating in it. Saturday night — my guests stamped into my cabin covered with snow from the blizzard that howled outside — it had been howling for a week. None of us gave it much thought — this was wintertime in Leith Harbour, South Georgia, and the Factory Ships and Transports had departed months ago for home leaving us behind to repair the Whale Chasing Ships for the following season. We did not expect mail, newspapers, or any contact with the outside, other than the official radio transmitter, for many more months to come. The squalor of the Whaling Station was buried under many feet of snow and to some extent it hid its ugliness. Meanwhile, as host, I filled the mugs of the guests and they drank deeply of the prune juice — no vintage wine ever tasted better — if one can judge from their eagerness to refill. The first bucket thawed them out, the second started the singing — songs of all kinds, Scottish, English, Norwegian, Swedish — old songs, bawdy songs, ditties, all sung unaccompanied — but with relish. Usually Bucket No. 3 produced philosophical nostalgia... [here he mentions that fights would also frequently break out...] Next morning would see all of us, slightly bruised but relieved of inner tensions, crawling over the ice-caked gangways on to ice-covered decks and into dimly-lit freezing engine rooms to repair engines.

=== Return to UK then migration to Australia ===
Returning to Middlesbrough in 1951, he married his wife Rita and took employment in the local steelworks, but inspired by his visits to Australia the couple, along with their newly born daughter decided to emigrate with the intention of settling in Brisbane. However, their initial plans had to be amended when Robertson was directed by migration authorities to work at the Newborough power station in Victoria, where the family stayed until he was able to obtain better employment with BHP in Port Kembla. Then in 1953, Robertson learned that the recently formed Australian whaling company Whale Products Pty. Ltd. was seeking an engineer for its newly purchased whale chasing vessels "Kos I" and "Kos II" operating out of their station at Tangalooma, in Moreton Bay, and joined the company in support of these two vessels, settling with his family in the Brisbane bayside suburb of Manly. During the course of his operations he visited Norfolk Island, whose inhabitants told him of their historical land-based whaling practices from which he constructed the song "Norfolk Whalers". He also spent time in 1956 whaling out of Ballina, New South Wales with the Byron Bay whaling ship "Byron 1", a timber built, ex-naval Fairmile with a converted tractor for a winch, which formed the background for his song "Ballina Whalers":

The crew on board this 'Brumbie' type whaling craft, to me, epitomised the 'Have a go, Aussies'. With no history of icy whaling tradition behind them, they fronted up to the task of capturing 40 and 50 foot whales, this was indeed a far cry from prawn net and hand line which had been their main tools as trawler men.

Tangalooma operated as a whaling station from 1953 to 1962; however, in 1956, Robertson took shore-based employment in shipyards on the Brisbane River, working for Evans Deakin and Company fitting out new tankers with engines, and also began to make more time for songwriting and performing; his songs "Shop Repairing Men" and "The Casuals" (dealing with activities at Cairncross Dockyard) date from this period. In 1967, young Australian men were also being conscripted to fight in the Vietnam War, and Robertson was inspired to compose several anti-war songs dealing with these events ("Freedom Free For All", "Brother Jack", "Is It True?"). He became well known on the local (then small) Australian folk scene and became involved in the first two Port Philip Folk Festivals which were held in Melbourne in 1967 and 1968, plus the 1969 Moreton Bay Folk Festival in Brisbane, which together are now more generally recognised as the first of the Australian National Folk Festivals. Around this time (in 1967), the nationally well known Australian folk singers Declan Affley and Mike Ball included four of Robertson's compositions on their album The Rake And Rambling Man (subtitled "Folk singers of Australia series; v. 1") which helped to bring his writing to a greater prominence.

=== Recordings and later life ===
Following the 1969 Festival, the fourth (1970) National Folk Festival was to be held in Sydney and Robertson and his family decided to relocate there to assist with the organisation of the Festival and also to provide a wider platform for his musical performances. In January 1971, he recorded his LP Whale Chasing Men (Music for Pleasure Australia; re-issued by ScreenSound Australia in 2001), an album unique in concept featuring songs written about his experiences in the 20th-century whaling industry with lead vocals by Robertson himself, Marian Henderson (credited as "Marion Henderson") and Alex Hood; Henderson took the lead on two tracks, "Whaling Wife" and "Norfolk Whalers", and Hood on two others, "Ballina Whalers" and "Murrumbidgee Whalers". Harry's song "Norfolk Whalers" from this album won the National Radio Award for Best Australian Composition of 1972.

Over the next few years, Robertson worked with film director and producer Ken Dyer, and composed music and wrote scripts for the ABC's A Big Country series, including a 1971 program entitled The Whalers, which depicted the last remaining whaling station in Australia at Albany, Western Australia, and won the Penguin Award of the Australian Television Society as well as the Shell $2000 Award for Production ("Albany's Whalers", "The Thrill of the Hunt"); the 1972 film No Longer Alone which dealt with the 1872 construction of the Overland Telegraph Line ("Poling in the Dry", "Poling in the Wet", "The Pole"); another entitled The Sleeper Cutters which dealt with workers in the timber industry cutting sleepers for the new railway lines ("Hard Timber", "Fettling on the Line"); plus Scratching for a Living which documented the history of tin mining on the Atherton Tableland in Queensland. With his family, Harry subsequently moved back to Brisbane where he continued to be an important figure on the local folk music scene as well as a respected singer and composer in the wider Australian folk music movement. In his later years he had a stroke which left him unable to sing and play; he died in Brisbane on 15 May 1995, and was commemorated with a concert in his honour at the 1995 Woodford Folk Festival organised by his friends from the late 1960s onwards, Evan and Lyn Mathieson, who later took on the role of perpetuating Robertson's legacy through a re-release of Whale Chasing Men, new recordings, and an official Harry Robertson website.

== Songwriting ==
Robertson was noted for his songs and poems about the lives of the whalers which he wrote without glorifying the industry, although his work also encompassed other topics including songs of other industries, both sea and land related; bawdy ballads; drinking songs; love songs, and songs of social protest. His best known whaling songs include "Queensland Whalers", "Ballina Whalers" and "Wee Pot Stove" (alternative title "Wee Dark Engine Room"), the latter two covered by the well known English singer Nic Jones on his 1980 album Penguin Eggs, under the titles "The Humpback Whale" and "The Little Pot Stove", respectively. "Ballina Whalers" was in fact performed in two different versions, the earliest as a shanty in the 1960s, prior to the version recorded on Whale Chasing Men. He also worked with the Welsh-born, Australian folk-singer, Declan Affley, to whom he dedicated his song "Wee Honey Jar" (To 'Doctor' Affley from a Patient). The 12 songs recorded for Whale Chasing Men were only a subset of his compositions, of which a much more extensive listing is given on the official website created on behalf of Harry's widow; a number of his otherwise unreleased compositions were subsequently recorded by Evan Mathieson on two CDs, Harry's Legacy (2007) and Tribute to Harry Robertson 1923-1995 (2009). Lyn Mathieson writes:

Harry Robertson was a singer songwriter in the true "oral tradition". He was not literate in musical notation so he did not write scores for his songs. His tunes were passed on by the actual singing in the true oral tradition. His words were very carefully chosen and worked in beautifully with the rhythm of his tunes. Harry's lyrics and music came from his lifelong love of the works of Robbie Burns, and the oral tradition heritage of his own musical Scottish family.

== List of known compositions ==
This list based on http://www.harryrobertson.net/HarryRobertsonSongs.html (July 2018 version), which contains full words and, in some cases, background material to the songs

- Albany's Whalers ***
- The Antarctic Fleet *
- Assisted Passage **
- Ballina Whalers *, ***
- A Bird **
- Blubber Laddie *
- Brother Jack ***
- Brown, Black, and White
- Casting Off *
- The Casuals **
- Cockatoo Hen
- Deep Sea Tug **
- Fettling On The Line **
- Fred The Fitter **
- Freedom Free For All **
- Grubby Jack
- Hard Timber **
- Heave Away **
- Homeless Man **
- Is It True? ***
- The Isle Of Cockatoo ***
- The 'Kaptajn Nielsen' ***
- The Modern Whaling Fleet
- Mountain Of Culture
- Mrs McGoo **
- Mrs O'Randy **
- Murrumbidgee Whalers *, ***
- A Musical Reflection ***
- Norfolk Whalers *, ***
- On The Boundary
- People
- Plague And The Censor
- The Pole ***
- Poling In The Dry ***
- Poling In The Wet ***
- The Politician ***
- Processing The Whale *
- Queensland Whalers *
- Reflections **
- Rodger's Folly ***
- Scratching For Tin ***
- Service Song **
- Ship Repairing Men **
- T2 T2 **
- Tanker Man **
- Terry On The Fence
- The Thrill Of The Hunt ***
- Time For A Laugh And A Song *, ***
- Turn The Tide
- Vision
- The 'W. D. Atlas' **
- Wee Honey Jar ***
- Wee Pot Stove (In The Wee Dark Engine Room) *, **
- Wet And Dry
- Whale Chasing Man *
- Whaling Wife *
- When You Get There

Notes: * included on Whale Chasing Men; ** included on Harry's Legacy; *** included on Tribute to Harry Robertson 1923-1995

== Bibliography ==
- Robertson, Harry; Butcher, Kevin (1972), Whaling songs of Harry Robertson, Albert Publications, ISBN 978-0-909700-23-2

== Discography ==
- Declan Affley and Mike Ball: The Rake And Rambling Man. Score POL 040, 1967 - includes their versions of Robertson's "Homeless Man", "Queensland Whalers", "The Antarctic Fleet" and "The Ship Repairing Man".
- Harry Robertson: Whale Chasing Men: Songs of Whaling in Ice and Sun. Music For Pleasure Australia MFP 8272, 1971. Marian ("Marion") Henderson and Alex Hood sing lead on some tracks.
- Declan Affley: Declan Affley - LP and cassette, TAR 020, 1987 - includes Robertson's "Ship Repairing Men" and "The Antarctic Fleet"
- Evan Mathieson: Harry's Legacy. MAMAIA 0701, 2007 - all tracks written by Robertson and performed by Mathieson
- Evan Mathieson: Tribute to Harry Robertson 1923-1995. MAMAIA 0902, 2009 - all tracks written by Robertson and performed by Mathieson.
