= Harry Robertson (painter) =

British painter (born 1943)

Harry Robertson is a Welsh painter born in Scarborough, Yorkshire, England in 1943. Elected to the Royal Cambrian Academy in 2010, Robertson is a realist who paints landscapes, mostly of Wales, as well as portraits. He serves on the Governing Council of the Royal Cambrian Society and is a member of the Wirral Society of Arts.

== Personal history ==
Harry Robertson was born in Scarborough, England in 1943 as the third child of a working mother who died when he was young. From the age of 11 he lived with a foster family first in Lancashire then in Manchester, England. He married Mari Robertson with whom he has a daughter, Natasha. Both Mari and Natasha are artists as well. He also has a son-in-law and two grandchildren.

Robertson worked in a variety of occupations including songwriting, music production, painting murals, and carpentry. He also spent time in education as an art instructor and ultimately as Head of School, Creative Arts Department, Tower Hamlets College.

Currently living and painting in Wales, Robertson also writes songs and plays in "The Tom, Dick and Harry Band".

== Education ==
- 1955-1962: Manchester High School of Art, Manchester England
- 1962-1966: Foundation Course; National Diploma in Design/Fine Art; Saint Martin's School of Art, London
- 1966-67: Post-Graduate Year Award; Saint Martin's School of Art, London
- 1967-68: Advanced Tertiary College, Hornsey College of Art, University of London

== Honours ==
- 2013: First Prize, North Wales Open
- 2013: Selected as one of 10 artists by the Wales Art Council to depict the valleys of Wales
- 2013: Maureen Hinchliffe Award, Williamson Museum
- 2012, 2015: First Prize, Oil painting, Wirral Society of Arts National Open Exhibition at the Williamson Museum
- 2007: Finalist, Wales Portrait Award
- 2007: Winner, 2007, North Wales Open Art Competition for amateurs and professionals
