= Bill Berry (folk singer) =

Australian folk singer and songwriter (1934–2019)

The Australian folk singer and songwriter Bill Berry (1934–2019) was born in Redcliffe, Queensland. He began singing at an early age, and his sister Marie was a singer with the National Opera Company. He joined the communist Eureka Youth League. An associate of the Sydney Push in the 1950s and early 1960s, he performed with John Meredith and the Heathcote Bushwhackers, before they became simply "The Bushwhackers". He later joined New Theatre and sang with the 'Unity Singers' and other left-wing singing groups. In the mid-1960s, he returned to Queensland where he married marine biologist Claire Rudkin and helped to establish the folk-song movement there, becoming a popular solo performer. His second wife was artist Hilary Burns. An oral history of his life and work has been recorded by folklorist Alex Hood.
