= Declan Affley =

Australian folk singer and musician

- Born: Declan James Affley; 8 September 1939; Cardiff, Wales
- Died: 27 June 1985 (aged 45) Sydney, Australia
- Genres: Folk music
- Occupations: Folk singer, actor
- Instruments: Guitar, banjo, tin whistle, fiddle, uilleann pipes
- Years active: 1960–1985

Declan James Affley (8 September 1939 – 27 June 1985) was an Australian folk singer and musician.

== Biography ==
Affley was born in Cardiff, Wales, to working-class Catholic parents of Irish descent. As a child, he learned to play the clarinet and picked up some Irish songs from his father.

At age 16, he joined the British Merchant Navy and travelled to Japan and Australia, where he jumped ship in 1959 to find work on coastal ships based in Sydney. At a harbourside pub, the Royal George, he discovered the Sydney Push and joined its folksinging scene, which had links with other establishments in Melbourne.

Affley became a regular performer at the Troubadour Coffee Lounge in Sydney and later at Frank Traynor's Folk Club, Melbourne, leading to appearances at many other venues and folk festivals. He played small parts in several films including Peter Weir's The Last Wave, and Richard Lowenstein's Strikebound, of which he was musical director. His group the Wild Colonial Boys appeared in the Tony Richardson film Ned Kelly in 1970.

He married Colleen Zeita Burke in Melbourne on 11 December 1967. A son and a daughter were born from the marriage.

Affley was well known as a singer of traditional songs such as "Carrickfergus" as well as performing the work of contemporary songwriters including John Dengate, Don Henderson, Dorothy Hewett and Harry Robertson. He died suddenly at the age of 45 from a dissecting aneurysm of the aorta.

== Memorial award ==
Affley is remembered by the Declan Affley memorial award for excellence in a young performer, awarded annually at the National Folk Festival in Canberra.

== Discography ==
- Declan Affley and Mike Ball: The Rake And Rambling Man. Score POL 040, 1967.
- Declan Affley: The Day the Pub Burned Down. M7 Records MLF-056, Sydney, 1970.
- Declan Affley – LP and cassette, TAR 020, 1987 (posthumous release)
- Declan Affley : vintage live recordings. CD, Australian Folk Archive AFA 001, 2003.

== Sound recording ==
- Declan Affley, The Larrikins, Seamus Gill, Daniel O Connell, Castleroe, Jimmy MacBride, R Brooks, Ken Greenhalgh, Kevin Butcher and others recorded for ABC Radio National in the Declan Affley folklore collection 1986 ABC Radio tape at Trove
