= Sweet and Low (TV series) =

- Genre: Music television
- Presented by: Bob Walters
- Country of origin: Australia
- Original language: English
- No. of episodes: 6

Production
- Running time: 30 minutes

Original release
- Network: ABC Television
- Release: 24 August – 26 September 1959

Sweet and Low is an Australian television series which aired from 24 August 1959 until 28 September 1959 on ABC Television station ABV-2 in Melbourne (with kinescope recordings being shown in Sydney on ABN-2 during 1960). Hosted by Bob Walters, the half-hour series presented performances by jazz musicians. Bruce Clarke appeared as a guest in the second episode.

Competition in the 9:00PM time-slot consisted of American imports, The Loretta Young Show on GTV-9 and Whitehall Playhouse (which consisted of selections from several US anthology series such as Studio 57) on HSV-7. It was preceded on ABV-2's schedule by U.S. drama series The Adventures of Falcon and followed by Australian-produced discussion show Come In on This.

There is no information as to whether any recordings (such as kinescopes) still exist of the series, raising the possibility it may be lost, though exact information is unavailable.
