= John Maze =

John Maze (1923–2008) was an Associate Professor of Psychology at the University of Sydney from 1951 to 1986. Recognised for his achievements in philosophy and psychology, he was awarded a Nuffield Foundation Travelling Fellowship with the University of London in 1958, and returned there as an Honorary Research Fellow in 1980. Maze's theoretical psychology extended from analyses of psychoanalytic metapsychology, to critique of concerns of psychology research of the day, including concepts of attitude, motivation, psychological homeostasis, psychological variables and social constructionism. Drawing on processes of conceptual and logical analysis, Maze sought to draw out logical inconsistencies and conceptual confusions apparent in theoretical psychological discourse. It is the logical structure of his theory and conclusions, as a function of a long connection with Andersonian realism which renders Maze's contribution as unique in theoretical psychology.

== Biography ==
=== Early life ===
John Maze was born in 1923, one of five children. His father, John William Maze, was born into a Protestant family in Northern Ireland in 1868; their mother was born Hannah Victoria Sherwin in Derby, England in 1887. They migrated independently to Australia as young adults before the First World War, met in Sydney and were married there. Maze's father was a member of the New South Wales police force, and Maze's mother died when he was aged 14. Serving in the Australian Military Forces during World War II, Maze was recruited to Intelligence, and was on a boat heading to New Guinea, when the atom bomb was dropped in the Pacific. On return home, Maze took the opportunity to go to university as offered to returned soldiers who could read and write, graduating with double first class honours in both psychology and philosophy.

=== Later career ===
On completing his studies, Maze was appointed in Sydney University's Department of Psychology by Professor William O’Neil in 1952, and his master's degree was presented in 1954. Maze received a Nuffield scholarship in London in 1958. Maze worked in the Department of Psychology at Sydney University for more than 34 years. Maze's papers were published in journals such as Psychological Review, the International Journal of Psychoanalysis, the International Review of Psychoanalysis, Theory and Psychology, and fall into four categories or themes.

== Ideas ==
=== Situational realism and psychoanalysis ===
Two relatively diverse currents of critical thinking shaped Maze's intellectual development. John Anderson, Challis Professor of Philosophy at Sydney University (1927 to 1958) had a substantial impact on students and on Maze, with a systematic philosophical approach grounded in realism, empiricism and pluralism (Baker, 1979). Anderson's systematic realism states that reality is composed of situations of irreducible and infinite complexity that occur in time and space (Passmore, 1962), which are circumscribed by the conditions of discourse (Maze, 1983). Logic is taken as the fundamental basis of knowledge (Baker, 1986), and it is Anderson's rigorous logical approach that is clearly reflected in Maze's writing on psychology and psychoanalysis (Henry, 2009).

The psychoanalysis and psychoanalytic technique of Sigmund Freud provided both content and structure on and by which Maze's materials and methods grew. In respect to content, Maze refined a view of psychology as “the study of how cognition shapes behaviour in the service of the instinctual drives” (Michell, 1988, p. 228), developing a theory of drives that suggested that biological instinct must underpin any form of later object-relation, reconciling a biological bases to observable psychological phenomena (or, at his historical moment, behaviour) without postulating unnecessary intervening variables or representations (Henry, 2009). In regards to structure, the psychoanalytic procedure of consistently returning to first principles in an effort to draw out any hidden or unconscious elements is reflected in Maze's writings on later paradigms relevant to psychology, including social constructionism, the information-processing approach of the cognitivists, and other forms of representationism (Turtle, 1997)

=== Concept of motivation ===
Against the behaviourism and the cognitivism of the time which looked for universal regularities in human psychology, Maze drew on Freud's theory that attributed primacy and determinism to the biological bases of drives in setting out a framework for individual differences in behavior and cognition, an approach that also was employed to set a foundation for human motivation (Boag, 2008). In regards to the cognitive representationism inherent within ego psychology and object relations theory which implies that internal representations of self must exist as objects, Maze worked to identify logical incoherence in these accounts insofar as the internal representations could only be qualified by the behavior or phenomena they produced. These internal representations then cannot be considered to exist as independent objects at risk of the logical fallacy of reification (Boag, 2007). The challenge to simplistic descriptions in psychology presented by Maze extended to critique of purposivist accounts of psychological homeostasis (1953/2009) and the logically plausible foundations of a concept of attitude (1973/2009).

=== Epistemology and the nature of cognition ===
At a time where the information processing approach to philosophy of mind dominated (see particularly Fodor, 1981), Maze presented a critique of the same as a logical fallacy, insofar as such accounts imply that it is only possible to know about events through internal processing of internal relations, without any reference to the independent entities or events in the real world that are said to be represented (Maze, 1991/2009). The critique highlights a central theme occurring throughout Maze's work, which is the rejection of any implication of constitutive relations. The rejection of constitutive relations is also evidenced in the critique of the relativism of social constructionism (Maze 2001/2009). Such an account leaves the concept of knowledge so constructed lost in circularity, without any point of reference to the external world. Maze also suggests that there is sterility in any approach that attempts to falsely reduce psychological processes down to simples – for example the theory within cognitive science that suggests perceptions are built up from a layering of sensory particulars to arrive at kinds (Henry, 2009). Maze's adoption of Anderson's situational realism rather suggests an irreducible complexity to each situation, where situations may be understood to be nested, and remain infinitely complex, in structure.

=== Psychoanalytic metatheory ===
Maze questioned whether the existence of values, goals, a need for love and understanding, choices, actions, drives and desire for meaning or knowledge could be considered to be inherent within the individual or “a constituent or characteristic of the organism” (Maze, 1952/2009, p. 25). Such concepts are taken on principle at face value as constituents in object relations theory, but critique in the form of the error of reification is suggested by Maze to render such approaches as logically incoherent. Maze (1993/2009) suggests that object relations theory is complemented by drive-instinct theory, because drive-instinct theory offers a basis for explanations about why particular objects are sought out. The notion of Freud's theory as a ‘one-person psychology’ as developed by later theorists who presented such theories as object relations theory as ‘two-person psychology’ is questioned by Maze, because drive-instinct theory never precluded and in some respects relied on the very existence of a second person in its original formulation of instincts or drives.

=== Application of psychoanalysis to literature and history ===
In Fyodor Dostoevsky and Virginia Woolf Maze selected authors who were sceptical analysts of the realm of human motivation and conventional morality, qualities resonant with his own endeavours. The entire corpus of Virginia Woolf's work was subject of the 1997 monograph 'Virginia Woolf; Feminism, Creativity, and the Unconscious', where Maze used psychoanalytic technique to draw together otherwise unrelated parts of the text to reveal chains of associations and something about the nature of the unconscious. Maze also collaborated with Graham White on two psychohistorical projects, with books on two prominent politicians from Roosevelt's New Deal Cabinet. At the age of 80 he set himself to write five novels, a fantasy fiction series for young adults surrounding the adventures of Cassandra Peel. The novels present in language suitable for young audiences the Greek deities, their fervours and foments, using everyday characters and aspects of everyday life.

Unprepared to compromise on the biological foundations of our human nature, Maze exposed, like Virginia Woolf and Dostoevsky, the falseness of moralism, the brutality underlying patriotism, the possessiveness of romantic love, the conformism, propaganda and censorship of respectability, the narcissism of sentimental or fashionable views of the world and the base self-interest of their underlying motives.
