= Don Henderson (folk singer) =

Don Henderson (1937–1991) was an Australian folk singer and songwriter.

Henderson's songs, which include The Basic Wage Dream, Boonaroo, and Put a Light in Every Country Window, are widely played and sung in the folk music tradition.

He wrote lyrics for the 1976 rock musical Hero presented by the Australian Opera in Sydney.
